

Deaths in July

5: Mika Myllylä
6: John Mackey
7: Dick Williams

Current sporting seasons

Australian rules football 2011

Australian Football League

Auto racing 2011

Formula One
Sprint Cup
Nationwide Series
Camping World Truck Series
IRL IndyCar Series
World Rally Championship
WTCC
V8 Supercar
Formula Two
GP2 Series
GP3 Series
American Le Mans
Le Mans Series
Rolex Sports Car Series
FIA GT1 World Championship
Auto GP
World Series by Renault
Deutsche Tourenwagen Masters
Super GT

Baseball 2011

Major League Baseball
Nippon Professional Baseball

Basketball 2011

WNBA
Philippines professional:
Governors Cup
Philippines collegiate:
NCAA
UAAP

Canadian football 2011

Canadian Football League

Cricket 2011

England:
County Championship
Clydesdale Bank 40
Friends Life t20

Football (soccer) 2011

National teams competitions
2011 Copa América
UEFA Euro 2012 qualifying
2012 Africa Cup of Nations qualification
2014 FIFA World Cup qualification
International clubs competitions
UEFA (Europe) Champions League
UEFA Europa League
AFC (Asia) Champions League
AFC Cup
CAF (Africa) Champions League
CAF Confederation Cup
CONCACAF (North & Central America) Champions League
Domestic (national) competitions
Brazil
Japan
Norway
Russia
Scotland
Major League Soccer (USA & Canada)
Women's Professional Soccer (USA)

Golf 2011

PGA Tour
European Tour
LPGA Tour
Champions Tour

Motorcycle racing 2011

Moto GP
Superbike World Championship
Supersport World Championship

Rugby league 2011

Super League
NRL

Rugby union 2011

Super Rugby
Currie Cup
ITM Cup

Tennis 2011

ATP World Tour
WTA Tour

Volleyball 2011

National teams competitions
World League
Men's European League
Women's European League

Days of the month

July 31, 2011 (Sunday)

Auto racing
Formula One:
 in Mogyoród, Hungary: (1) Jenson Button  (McLaren–Mercedes) (2) Sebastian Vettel  (Red Bull–Renault) (3) Fernando Alonso  (Ferrari)
Drivers' championship standings (after 11 of 19 races): (1) Vettel 234 points (2) Mark Webber  (Red Bull-Renault) 149 (3) Lewis Hamilton  (McLaren-Mercedes) 146
Sprint Cup Series:
Brickyard 400 in Speedway, Indiana: (1)  Paul Menard (Chevrolet; Richard Childress Racing) (2)  Jeff Gordon (Chevrolet; Hendrick Motorsports) (3)  Regan Smith (Chevrolet; Furniture Row Racing)
Drivers' championship standings (after 20 of 36 races): (1)  Carl Edwards (Ford; Roush Fenway Racing) 682 points (2)  Jimmie Johnson (Chevrolet; Hendrick Motorsports) 671 (3)  Kevin Harvick (Chevrolet; Richard Childress Racing) 670
World Touring Car Championship:
Race of Germany in Oschersleben:
Race 1: (1) Yvan Muller  (Chevrolet; Chevrolet Cruze) (2) Robert Huff  (Chevrolet; Chevrolet Cruze) (3) Gabriele Tarquini  (Lukoil – SUNRED; SEAT León)
Race 2: (1) Franz Engstler  (Engstler Motorsport; BMW 320 TC) (2) Alain Menu  (Chevrolet; Chevrolet Cruze) (3) Tarquini
Drivers' championship standings (after 8 of 12 rounds): (1) Huff 289 points (2) Muller 283 (3) Menu 220

Basketball
FIBA Under-19 World Championship for Women in Puerto Montt, Chile:
3rd place game:  67–70  
Final:   46–69  
The United States win the title for the fourth consecutive time, and fifth time overall.
FIBA Europe Under-18 Championship in Wrocław, Poland:
Bronze medal game:  65–69  
Final:   71–65  
Spain win the title for the first time since 2004, and third time overall.

Cricket
India in England:
2nd Test in Nottingham, day 3:  221 & 441/6 (101 overs; Ian Bell 159);  288. England lead by 374 runs with 4 wickets remaining.
ICC Intercontinental Cup, round 1:
In Nairobi, day 4:  213 & 439/8d;  219 & 167 (61.1 overs). United Arab Emirates win by 266 runs.

Cycling
UCI World Tour:
Tour de Pologne, stage 1:  Marcel Kittel  2h 07' 26"  Alexander Kristoff  s.t.  Francesco Chicchi  s.t.
General classification (after stage 1): (1) Kittel  2h 07' 16" (2) Kristoff + 4" (3) Adrian Kurek  (Team Poland BGŻ)  + 5"
UCI Women's Road World Cup:
Open de Suède Vårgårda, Road Race:  Annemiek van Vleuten  3h 19' 49"     Ellen van Dijk  s.t.  Nicole Cooke  s.t.

Equestrianism
Royal International Horse Show in Hickstead, United Kingdom:
Show jumping – King Georges V Gold Cup (Grand Prix) (CSIO 5*):  Kent Farrington  on Uceko  Robert Smith  on Talan  Leon Thijssen  on Tyson
Dressage – World Dressage Masters (CDI 5*):
Grand Prix Freestyle (A-Final):  Adelinde Cornelissen  on Parzival  Carl Hester  on Uthopia  Emma Hindle  on Lancet
Grand Prix Spécial (B-Final):  Charlotte Dujardin  on Valegro  Leida Collins-Strijk  on On Top  Sander Marijnissen  on Moedwil

Extreme sports
X Games XVII in Los Angeles (USA unless stated):
Hometown Heroes Amateur Skateboard Street:  Julian Christianson 88.33  Brendon Villanueva 86.66  Dan Coe 80.00
RallyCross:  Brian Deegan 5:02.585  Tanner Foust 5:08.816  Marcus Grönholm  5:09.213
BMX Street:  Garrett Reynolds 92  Dennis Enarson 85  Dakota Roche 84
Skateboard Game of SK8:  Ryan Decenzo   Brandon Westgate  Silas Baxter-Neal
Men's Moto X Enduro:  Taddy Blazusiak  9:06.439  Mike Brown 9:20.930  Justin Soule 9:33.448
Women's Moto X Enduro:  Maria Forsberg 8:31.375  Tarah Gieger  9:37.734  Kacy Martinez 10:01.286

Football (soccer)
FIFA U-20 World Cup in Colombia:
Group C in Manizales:
 1–4 
 1–1 
Group D in Armenia:
 5–0 
 0–2 
UEFA Women's Under-17 Championship in Nyon, Switzerland:
Third place match:  2–8  
Final:   1–0  
Spain win the title for the second successive time.
CAF Confederation Cup, Group stage, Matchday 2:
Group A:
Inter Luanda  1–0  ASEC Mimosas
Club Africain  0–0  Kaduna United
Standings (after 2 matches): Inter Luanda 4 points, Club Africain, Kaduna United 2, ASEC Mimosas 1.
Group B: Motema Pembe  1–1  Maghreb de Fès
Standings (after 2 matches):  Sunshine Stars 6 points, Maghreb de Fès 4, Motema Pembe 1,  JS Kabylie 0.

Golf
Women's majors:
Ricoh Women's British Open in Carnoustie, Angus, Scotland:
Leaderboard after final round: (1) Yani Tseng  272 (−16) (2) Brittany Lang  276 (−12) (3) Sophie Gustafson  277 (−11)
Tseng wins her second consecutive British Open, for her second major of the year, and fifth of her career.
Senior majors:
U.S. Senior Open Championship in Toledo, Ohio:
Leaderboard after final round (all USA): (1) Olin Browne 269 (−15) (2) Mark O'Meara 272 (−12) (3) Mark Calcavecchia 273 (−11)
Browne wins his first senior major.
PGA Tour:
Greenbrier Classic in White Sulphur Springs, West Virginia:
Winner: Scott Stallings  270 (−10)PO
Stallings defeats Bob Estes  & Bill Haas  on the first playoff hole to win his first PGA Tour title.
European Tour:
Irish Open in Killarney, Ireland:
Winner: Simon Dyson  269 (−15)
Dyson wins his fifth European Tour title.

Motorcycle racing
Superbike:
Silverstone World Championship round in Silverstone, Great Britain:
Race 1: (1) Carlos Checa  (Ducati 1098R) (2) Eugene Laverty  (Yamaha YZF-R1) (3) Marco Melandri  (Yamaha YZF-R1)
Race 2: (1) Checa (2) Laverty (3) Melandri
Riders' championship standings (after 9 of 13 rounds): (1) Checa 343 points (2) Max Biaggi  (Aprilia RSV4) 281 (3) Melandri 272
Supersport:
Silverstone World Championship round in Silverstone, Great Britain: (1) Chaz Davies  (Yamaha YZF-R6) (2) David Salom  (Kawasaki Ninja ZX-6R) (3) Fabien Foret  (Honda CBR600RR)
Riders' championship standings (after 8 of 12 rounds): (1) Davies 146 points (2) Salom 104 (3) Foret 101

Swimming
World Aquatics Championships in Shanghai, China:
Women's 50m breaststroke:  Jessica Hardy  30.19  Yuliya Yefimova  30.49  Rebecca Soni  30.58
Hardy wins the event for the second time.
Men's 400m individual medley:  Ryan Lochte  4:07.13  Tyler Clary  4:11.17  Yuya Horihata  4:11.98
Lochte wins the event for the second successive time, and his fifth title of the championships and twelfth world title overall.
Women's 50m freestyle:  Therese Alshammar  24.14  Ranomi Kromowidjojo  24.27  Marleen Veldhuis  24.49
Alshammar wins her second world title, and becomes the oldest woman to win an individual title at the age of 33.
Men's 50m backstroke:  Liam Tancock  24.50  Camille Lacourt  24.57  Gerhard Zandberg  24.66
Tancock wins the event for the second successive time.
Men's 1500m freestyle:  Sun Yang  14:34.14 (WR)  Ryan Cochrane  14:44.46  Gergő Kis  14:45.66
Sun wins his second title of the championships.
Sun breaks the longest-standing long-course world record previously held by Grant Hackett  from July 2001.
Women's 400m individual medley:  Elizabeth Beisel  4:31.78  Hannah Miley  4:34.22  Stephanie Rice  4:34.23
Men's 4 × 100 m medley relay:   (Nick Thoman, Mark Gangloff, Michael Phelps, Nathan Adrian) 3:32.06   (Hayden Stoeckel, Brenton Rickard, Geoff Huegill, James Magnussen) 3:32.26   (Helge Meeuw, Hendrik Feldwehr, Benjamin Starke, Paul Biedermann) 3:32.60
Phelps wins the event for the fourth time, and his fourth title of the championships and 26th world title overall.
Gangloff wins the event for the third time.
Adrian wins the event for the second successive time and his third world title.

Tennis
ATP World Tour:
Credit Agricole Suisse Open Gstaad in Gstaad, Switzerland:
Final: Marcel Granollers  def. Fernando Verdasco  6–4, 3–6, 6–3
Granollers wins his second ATP Tour title, and first since 2008.
Farmers Classic in Los Angeles, United States:
Final: Ernests Gulbis  def. Mardy Fish  5–7, 6–4, 6–4
Gulbis wins his second ATP Tour title.
Studena Croatia Open in Umag, Croatia:
Final: Alexandr Dolgopolov  def. Marin Čilić  6–4, 3–6, 6–3
Dolgopolov wins his first ATP Tour title.
WTA Tour:
Bank of the West Classic in Stanford, United States:
Final: Serena Williams  def. Marion Bartoli  7–5, 6–1
Williams wins her 38th career title.
Citi Open in Washington, D.C., United States:
Final: Nadia Petrova  def. Shahar Pe'er  7–5, 6–2
Petrova wins her tenth WTA Tour title, and first since 2008.

Volleyball
FIVB Women's Junior World Championship in Lima, Peru:
3rd place match:   3–1 
Final:   3–1  
Italy win the title for the first time.

July 30, 2011 (Saturday)

Auto racing
Nationwide Series:
Kroger 200 in Clermont, Indiana: (1)  Brad Keselowski (Dodge; Penske Racing) (2)  James Buescher (Chevrolet; Turner Motorsports) (3)  Ricky Stenhouse Jr. (Ford; Roush Fenway Racing)
Drivers' championship standings (after 21 of 34 races): (1) Stenhouse Jr. 740 points (2)  Reed Sorenson (Chevrolet; Turner Motorsports) 737 (3)  Elliott Sadler (Chevrolet; Kevin Harvick Incorporated) 716
World Rally Championship:
Rally Finland in Jyväskylä, Finland: (1) Sébastien Loeb /Daniel Elena  (Citroën DS3 WRC) (2) Jari-Matti Latvala /Miikka Anttila  (Ford Fiesta RS WRC) (3) Sébastien Ogier /Julien Ingrassia  (Citroën DS3 WRC)
Drivers' championship standings (after 8 of 13 rallies): (1) Loeb 171 points (2) Mikko Hirvonen  (Ford Fiesta RS WRC) 144 (3) Ogier 140

Cricket
India in England:
2nd Test in Nottingham, day 2:  221 & 24/1 (11 overs);  288 (91.1 overs; Rahul Dravid 117, Stuart Broad 6/46). England trail by 43 runs with 9 wickets remaining.
Broad bowls the 39th hat-trick in Test cricket, claiming the wickets of Mahendra Singh Dhoni, Harbhajan Singh and Praveen Kumar. Broad becomes the twelfth Englishman to achieve a hat-trick and the first since Ryan Sidebottom in 2008.
ICC Intercontinental Cup, round 1:
In Nairobi, day 3:  213 & 439/8d (114.2 overs; Saqib Ali 153, Khurram Khan 113, Amjad Javed 100);  219 & 76/4 (25 overs). Kenya require another 358 runs with 6 wickets remaining.

Cycling
UCI World Tour:
Clásica de San Sebastián:  Philippe Gilbert  5h 48' 52"  Carlos Barredo  + 12"  Greg Van Avermaet  + 14"
UCI World Tour standings (after 18 of 27 races): (1) Cadel Evans  574 points (2) Gilbert 482 (3) Alberto Contador  471

Extreme sports
X Games XVII in Los Angeles (USA unless stated):
BMX Park:  Daniel Dhers  81  Dennis Enarson 81  Scotty Cranmer 72
Rally Car Racing:  Liam Doran   Marcus Grönholm   David Higgins 
Skateboard Street:  Nyjah Huston 91.66  Luan Oliveira  91.00  Ryan Sheckler 89.00
Women's Moto X Racing:  Vicki Golden 3:43.258  Tarah Gieger  3:47.636  Livia Lancelot  3:54.441
Skateboard Vert:  Shaun White 93.00  Pierre-Luc Gagnon  91.66  Bucky Lasek 87.66
Moto X Speed & Style:  Nate Adams 90.00  Mike Mason 88.53  Ronnie Faisst 91.01

Football (soccer)
FIFA U-20 World Cup in Colombia:
Group A in Bogotá:
 0–2 
 4–1 
Group B in Cali:
 1–1 
 0–0 
CAF Champions League Group stage, Matchday 2:
Group A: Coton Sport  2–3  Enyimba
Standings (after 2 matches): Enyimba,  Al-Hilal 4 points, Coton Sport,  Raja Casablanca 1.
Group B:
Wydad Casablanca  4–0  MC Alger
Espérance ST  1–0  Al-Ahly
Standings (after 2 matches): Wydad Casablanca, Espérance ST 4 points, Al-Ahly, MC Alger 1.

Golf
Women's majors:
Ricoh Women's British Open in Carnoustie, Angus, Scotland:
Leaderboard after third round: (1) Caroline Masson  201 (−15) (2) Yani Tseng  203 (−13) (T3) Catriona Matthew  & Inbee Park  207 (−9)
Senior majors:
U.S. Senior Open Championship in Toledo, Ohio:
Leaderboard after third round (USA unless stated): (1) Olin Browne 198 (−15) (2) Mark O'Meara 200 (−13) (T3) Mark Calcavecchia, Peter Senior , Joey Sindelar & Jeff Sluman 204 (−9)

Handball
Men's Junior World Championship in Thessaloniki, Greece:
3rd place game:   24–18 
Final:   27–18  
Germany win the title for the second successive time.

Mixed martial arts
Strikeforce: Fedor vs. Henderson in Hoffman Estates, Illinois, United States:
Heavyweight bout: Dan Henderson  def. Fedor Emelianenko  via TKO (punches)
Women's Welterweight Championship bout: Miesha Tate  def. Marloes Coenen  (c) via submission (arm triangle)
Middleweight bout: Tim Kennedy  def. Robbie Lawler  via unanimous decision (30–27, 30–27, 30–27)
Welterweight bout: Tyron Woodley  def. Paul Daley  via unanimous decision (29–28, 29–28, 29–28)
Welterweight bout: Tarec Saffiedine  def. Scott Smith  via unanimous decision (30–27, 30–27, 30–26)

Rugby union
Tri Nations Series:
 40–7  in Wellington
The All Blacks' Dan Carter reclaims the career lead in Test points from England's Jonny Wilkinson.
Standings: New Zealand,  5 points (1 match), South Africa 0 (2)

Swimming
World Aquatics Championships in Shanghai, China:
Women's 50m butterfly:  Inge Dekker  25.71  Therese Alshammar  25.76  Mélanie Henique  25.86
Dekker wins her second title of the championships and third world title overall.
Men's 50m freestyle:  César Cielo  21.52  Luca Dotto  21.90  Alain Bernard  21.92
Cielo wins the event for the second successive time, and his second title of the championships and fourth world title overall.
Women's 200m backstroke:  Missy Franklin  2:05.10 (AM)  Belinda Hocking  2:06.06  Sharon van Rouwendaal  2:07.78
Franklin wins her second title of the championships.
Men's 100m butterfly:  Michael Phelps  50.71  Konrad Czerniak  51.15  Tyler McGill  51.26
Phelps wins the event for the third successive time, and his third title of the championships and 25th world title overall.
Women's 800m freestyle:  Rebecca Adlington  8:17.51  Lotte Friis  8:18.20  Kate Ziegler  8:23.36
Women's 4 × 100 m medley relay:   (Natalie Coughlin, Rebecca Soni, Dana Vollmer, Franklin) 3:52.36   (Zhao Jing, Ji Liping, Lu Ying, Tang Yi) 3:55.61   (Hocking, Leisel Jones, Alicia Coutts, Merindah Dingjan) 3:57.13
The United States win the event for the first time since 1998.
Coughlin wins her sixth world title.
Soni wins her third title of the championships and fourth world title overall.
Vollmer wins her second title of the championships and third world title overall.
Franklin wins her third title of the championships.

Volleyball
Asian Men's Club Championship in Palembang, Indonesia:
3rd place match: Osaka Blazers Sakai  0–3   Shanghai Tang Dynasty
Final:  Almaty  0–3   Paykan Tehran
Paykan Tehran win the title for the sixth successive time and seventh time overall.

Water polo
World Aquatics Championships in Shanghai, China:
Men's tournament:
7th place game:  5–8 
5th place game:  10–11 
Bronze medal game:  11–12  
Gold medal game:   7–8  
Italy win the title for the third time.

July 29, 2011 (Friday)

Athletics
Samsung Diamond League:
DN Galan in Stockholm, Sweden:
Men:
110m hurdles: Jason Richardson  13.17
200m: Usain Bolt  20.03
400m: Jermaine Gonzales  44.69
1500m: Silas Kiplagat  3:33.94
3000m steeplechase: Paul Kipsiele Koech  8:05.92
Discus throw: Virgilijus Alekna  65.05m
High jump: Ivan Ukhov  2.34m
Javelin throw: Andreas Thorkildsen  88.43m
Long jump: Mitchell Watt  8.54m
Women:
100m: Carmelita Jeter  11.15
400m hurdles: Kaliese Spencer  53.74
800m: Kenia Sinclair  1:58.21
5000m: Vivian Cheruiyot  14:20.87
Pole vault: Yelena Isinbayeva  4.76m
Triple jump: Olha Saladukha  15.06m

Cricket
India in England:
2nd Test in Nottingham, day 1:  221 (68.4 overs);  24/1 (15 overs). India trail by 197 runs with 9 wickets remaining in the 1st innings.
ICC Intercontinental Cup, round 1:
In Nairobi, day 2:  213 & 155/3 (46 overs);  219 (70.5 overs). United Arab Emirates lead by 149 runs with 7 wickets remaining.

Cycling
UCI Women's Road World Cup:
Open de Suède Vårgårda, Team Time Trial:  |   Ellen van Dijk, Judith Arndt, Charlotte Becker,  Amber Neben  AA-Drink Cycling Team Lucinda Brand,  Linda Melanie Villumsen,  Kirsten Wild,  Trixi Worrack    Elizabeth Armitstead, Noemi Cantele, Sharon Laws, Emma Pooley, Iris Slapendel

Equestrianism
Royal International Horse Show in Hickstead, United Kingdom:
Show jumping – FEI Nations Cup:
Nations Cup of the United Kingdom (CSIO 5*):   (Janne Friederike Meyer, Holger Wulschner, Philipp Weishaupt, Marcus Ehning)   (Olivier Guillon, Roger-Yves Bost, Pénélope Leprevost, Kevin Staut)   (Christine McCrea, Kent Farrington, Laura Kraut, Beezie Madden)
Standings (after 6 of 8 events): (1)  42 points (2) Germany 37 (3)  32.5

Extreme sports
X Games XVII in Los Angeles (USA unless stated):
Women's Skateboard Street:  Marisa Dal Santo 88.00  Alexis Sablone 84.33  Leticia Bufoni  78.00
Moto X Freestyle:  Nate Adams 91  Adam Jones 86  Dany Torres  86
BMX Vert:  Jamie Bestwick  92  Steve McCann  90  Vince Byron  79
Bestwick wins the gold for the fifth consecutive year.
Skateboarding Big Air:  Bob Burnquist  92.66  Adam Taylor 89.66  Edgard Pereira  87.00

Football (soccer)
FIFA U-20 World Cup in Colombia:
Group E:
 0–0  in Cartagena
 1–1  in Barranquilla
Group F in Medellín:
 0–0 
 1–0 
UEFA European Under-19 Championship in Romania:
Semifinals:
 4–2  in Mogoşoaia
 5–0  in Chiajna
CAF Champions League Group stage, Matchday 2:
Group A: Al-Hilal  1–0  Raja Casablanca
Standings: Al-Hilal 4 points (2 matches),  Enyimba,  Coton Sport 1 (1), Raja Casablanca 1 (2).
CAF Confederation Cup Group stage, Matchday 2:
Group B: JS Kabylie  1–2  Sunshine Stars
Standings: Sunshine Stars 6 points (2 matches),  Maghreb de Fès 3 (1), JS Kabylie 0 (2),  Motema Pembe 0 (1).

Golf
Women's majors:
Ricoh Women's British Open in Carnoustie, Angus, Scotland:
Leaderboard after second round: (1) Caroline Masson  133 (−11) (T2) Meena Lee  & Inbee Park  134 (−10)
Senior majors:
U.S. Senior Open Championship in Toledo, Ohio:
Leaderboard after second round (all USA): (1) Olin Browne 133 (−9) (2) Mark O'Meara 134 (−8) (T3) Michael Allen, Mark Calcavecchia & Joey Sindelar 135 (−7)

Swimming
World Aquatics Championships in Shanghai, China:
Women's 100m freestyle:  Jeanette Ottesen  & Aleksandra Gerasimenya  53.45  Ranomi Kromowidjojo  53.66
Men's 200m backstroke:  Ryan Lochte  1:52.96  Ryosuke Irie  1:54.11  Tyler Clary  1:54.69
Lochte wins the event for the second time, and his third title of the championships and tenth world title overall.
Women's 200m breaststroke:  Rebecca Soni  2:21.47  Yuliya Yefimova  2:22.22  Martha McCabe  2:24.81
Soni wins her second title of the championships, and third world title overall.
Men's 200m breaststroke:  Dániel Gyurta  2:08.41  Kosuke Kitajima  2:08.63  Christian vom Lehn  2:09.06
Gyurta wins the event for the second successive time.
Men's 4 × 200 m freestyle relay:   (Michael Phelps, Peter Vanderkaay, Ricky Berens, Lochte) 7:02.67   (Yannick Agnel, Grégory Mallet, Jérémy Stravius, Fabien Gilot) 7:04.81   (Wang Shun, Zhang Lin, Li Yunqi, Sun Yang) 7:05.67
The United States win the event for the fourth successive time, with Phelps, Lochte and Vanderkaay among the winning teams.
Phelps wins his second title of the championships and 24th world title overall.
Lochte wins his fourth title of the championships and 11th world title overall.
Berens wins the event for the second successive time and his third world title overall.

Water polo
World Aquatics Championships in Shanghai, China:
Women's tournament:
7th place game:  7–8 
5th place game:  5–10 
Bronze medal game:   8–7 
Gold medal game:  8–9  
Greece win the title for the first time.

July 28, 2011 (Thursday)

Athletics
Samsung Diamond League:
DN Galan in Stockholm, Sweden:
Men's shot put: Christian Cantwell  21.70m
Women's shot put: Valerie Adams  20.57m

Cricket
ICC Intercontinental Cup, round 1:
In Nairobi, day 1:  213 (67.3 overs);  91/3 (22.5 overs). Kenya trail by 122 runs with 7 wickets remaining in the 1st innings.

Extreme sports
X Games XVII in Los Angeles (USA unless stated):
Moto X Step Up:  Matt Buyten 37' 0"  Ronnie Renner 35' 6"  Myles Richmond & Brian Deegan 35' 6"
Skateboard Park:  Raven Tershy 82  Pedro Barros  81  Ben Hatchell 75
Moto X Best Whip:  Jeremy Stenberg 27%  Todd Potter 24%  Jarryd McNeil  22%
Moto X Best Trick:  Jackson Strong  95.66  Cam Sinclair  94.66  Josh Sheehan  93.33
BMX Freestyle Big Air:  Steve McCann  91.66   Vince Byron  90.66  Chad Kagy 89.33

Football (soccer)
2014 FIFA World Cup qualification (AFC) Second round, second leg (first leg scores in parentheses):
 0–2 (0–2)  — Match abandoned after 40 minutes due to crowd trouble.
 1–1 (0–9) . Jordan win 10–1 on aggregate.
 1–6 (2–7) . China PR win 13–3 on aggregate.
 1–2 (0–3) . Kuwait win 5–1 on aggregate.
 0–4 (1–2) . Syria win 6–1 on aggregate.
 0–3 (0–4) . Uzbekistan win 7–0 on aggregate.
 2–0 (0–4) . Lebanon win 4–2 on aggregate.
 4–3 (1–1) . Indonesia win 5–4 on aggregate.
 0–5 (0–3) . Saudi Arabia win 8–0 on aggregate.
 2–1 (0–3) . Qatar win 4–2 on aggregate.
 1–1 (3–5) . Singapore win 6–4 on aggregate.
 2–2 (0–3) . United Arab Emirates win 5–2 on aggregate.
 2–2 (0–1) . Thailand win 3–2 on aggregate.
 0–1 (0–4) . Iran win 5–0 on aggregate.
 0–0 (0–2)  in Al Ain, United Arab Emirates. Iraq win 2–0 on aggregate.
UEFA Women's Under-17 Championship in Nyon, Switzerland:
Semifinals:
 0–4 
 2–2 (5–6 pen.) 
UEFA Europa League Third qualifying round, first leg:
Śląsk Wrocław  0–0  Lokomotiv Sofia
AEK Larnaca  3–0  Mladá Boleslav
Ventspils  1–2  Red Star Belgrade
Alania Vladikavkaz  1–1  Aktobe
Karpaty Lviv  2–0  St Patrick's Athletic
Olimpija Ljubljana  1–1  Austria Wien
Aalesund  4–0  Elfsborg
Metalurgist Rustavi  2–5  Rennes
Red Bull Salzburg  1–0  Senica
Anorthosis  0–2  Rabotnički
Sparta Prague  5–0  Sarajevo
Vorskla Poltava  0–0  Sligo Rovers
Vålerenga  0–2  PAOK
Young Boys  3–1  Westerlo
Bursaspor  2–1  Gomel
Hapoel Tel Aviv  4–0  Vaduz
Omonia  3–0  ADO Den Haag
Split  0–0  Fulham
Levski Sofia  2–1  Spartak Trnava
AZ Alkmaar  2–0  Jablonec
Gaziantepspor  0–1  Legia Warsaw
Dinamo București  2–2  Varaždin
Differdange 03  0–3  Olympiakos Volou
Paks  1–1  Heart of Midlothian
Željezničar  0–2  Maccabi Tel Aviv
Club Brugge  4–1  Qarabağ
Mainz 05  1–1  Gaz Metan Mediaș
Palermo  2–2  Thun
Stoke City  1–0  Hajduk Split
Nacional  3–0  Häcken
Atlético Madrid  2–1  Strømsgodset
Midtjylland  0–0  Vitória Guimarães
Ried  2–0  Brøndby
KR Reykjavík  1–4  Dinamo Tbilisi
CONCACAF Champions League Preliminary Round, first leg:
Morelia  5–0  Tempête
Alianza  0–1  FC Dallas
Motagua  4–0  Municipal

Golf
Women's majors:
Ricoh Women's British Open in Carnoustie, Angus, Scotland:
Leaderboard after first round: (1) Meena Lee  65 (−7) (2) Brittany Lincicome  67 (−5) (T3) Sophie Gustafson , Caroline Masson , Angela Stanford  & Amy Yang  68 (−4)
Senior majors:
U.S. Senior Open Championship in Toledo, Ohio:
Leaderboard after first round (all USA): (1) Olin Browne 64 (−7) (T2) Michael Allen & Mark O'Meara 66 (−5)

Swimming
World Aquatics Championships in Shanghai, China:
Men's 200m individual medley:  Ryan Lochte  1:54.00 (WR)  Michael Phelps  1:54.16  László Cseh  1:57.69
Lochte wins the event for the second successive time, and his second title of the championships and ninth world title overall.
Lochte breaks his own world record by 0.10 seconds and sets the first long-course world record since non-textile swimsuits were outlawed at the end of 2009.
Men's 100m freestyle:  James Magnussen  47.63  Brent Hayden  47.95  William Meynard  48.00
Magnussen wins his second title of the championships.
Women's 200m butterfly:  Jiao Liuyang  2:05.55  Ellen Gandy  2:05.59  Liu Zige  2:05.90
Jiao wins her second world championship title.
Women's 50m backstroke:  Anastasia Zuyeva  27.79  Aya Terakawa  27.93  Missy Franklin  28.01
Women's 4 × 200 m freestyle relay:   (Franklin, Dagny Knutson, Katie Hoff, Allison Schmitt) 7:46.14   (Bronte Barratt, Blair Evans, Angie Bainbridge, Kylie Palmer) 7:47.42   (Chen Qian, Pang Jiaying, Liu Jing, Tang Yi) 7:47.66
Hoff wins her seventh world championship title.

Water polo
World Aquatics Championships in Shanghai, China:
Men's tournament:
Semifinals:
 14–15 
 8–9 
Classification 5–8 Semifinals:
 9–8 
 9–10 
11th place game:  15–18 
9th place game:  6–8

July 27, 2011 (Wednesday)

American football
The University of North Carolina fires head coach Butch Davis after four seasons, in the midst of an NCAA investigation.

Baseball
Major League Baseball: Los Angeles Angels 3, Cleveland Indians 1

Football (soccer)
UEFA Champions League Third qualifying round, first leg:
HJK Helsinki  1–2  Dinamo Zagreb
Copenhagen  1–0  Shamrock Rovers
Odense  1–1  Panathinaikos
Maccabi Haifa  2–1  Maribor
Standard Liège  1–1  Zürich
Rosenborg  0–1  Viktoria Plzeň
Benfica  2–0  Trabzonspor
CONCACAF Champions League Preliminary Round, first leg:
Toronto FC  2–1  Real Estelí
Isidro Metapán  2–0  Puerto Rico Islanders
Santos Laguna  3–1  Olimpia
 2011 MLS All-Star Game in Harrison, New Jersey: MLS All-Stars 0–4  Manchester United
 Trophée des Champions in Tangier, Morocco: Lille 4–5 Marseille
Marseille win the title for the second time.

Swimming
World Aquatics Championships in Shanghai, China:
Men's 200m butterfly:  Michael Phelps  1:53.34  Takeshi Matsuda  1:54.01  Wu Peng  1:54.67
Phelps wins the event for a record fifth time and his 23rd world championship title.
Women's 200m freestyle:  Federica Pellegrini  1:55.58  Kylie Palmer  1:56.04  Camille Muffat  1:56.10
Pellegrini wins the event for the second time and her fourth world championship title.
Men's 800m freestyle:  Sun Yang  7:38.47  Ryan Cochrane  7:41.86  Gergő Kis  7:44.94
Men's 50m breaststroke:  Felipe França Silva  27.01  Fabio Scozzoli  27.17  Cameron van der Burgh  27.19

Water polo
World Aquatics Championships in Shanghai, China:
Women's tournament:
Semifinals:
 14–11 
 12–13 
Greece and China reach the final for the first time.
Classification 5–8 Semifinals:
 8–4 
 7–12 
11th place game:  7–15 
9th place game:  7–12

July 26, 2011 (Tuesday)

Cricket
ICC Intercontinental Cup One-Day, round 1:
4th Match in Nairobi:  230/9 (50 overs; Rakep Patel 124);  233/6 (46.4 overs). United Arab Emirates win by 4 wickets.

Football (soccer)
UEFA European Under-19 Championship in Romania (teams in bold advance to semifinals):
Group A:
 1–0  in Mogoşoaia
 0–0  in Berceni
Final standings: Czech Republic 9 points, Republic of Ireland 4, Greece 3, Romania 1.
Group B:
 3–0  in Chiajna
 1–1  in Buftea
Final standings: Spain 6 points, Serbia, Turkey 4, Belgium 2.
UEFA Champions League Third qualifying round, first leg:
Zestafoni  1–1  Sturm Graz
Ekranas  0–0  BATE Borisov
APOEL  0–0  Slovan Bratislava
Litex Lovech  1–2  Wisła Kraków
Dynamo Kyiv  0–2  Rubin Kazan
Genk  2–1  Partizan
Rangers  0–1  Malmö FF
Twente  2–0  Vaslui
UEFA Europa League Third qualifying round, first leg: Bnei Yehuda  1–0  Helsingborg
CONCACAF Champions League Preliminary Round, first leg:
San Francisco  1–0  Seattle Sounders
Herediano  8–0  Alpha United

Swimming
World Aquatics Championships in Shanghai, China:
Men's 200m freestyle:  Ryan Lochte  1:44.44  Michael Phelps  1:44.79  Paul Biedermann  1:44.88
Lochte wins his eighth world championship title.
Women's 100m backstroke:  Zhao Jing  59.05  Anastasia Zuyeva  59.06  Natalie Coughlin  59.15
Zhao wins her third world championship title.
Women's 1500m freestyle:  Lotte Friis  15:49.59  Kate Ziegler  15:55.60  Li Xuanxu  15:58.02
Friis wins her second world championship title.
Men's 100m backstroke:  Camille Lacourt  & Jérémy Stravius  52.76  Ryosuke Irie  52.98
Women's 100m breaststroke:  Rebecca Soni  1:05.05  Leisel Jones  1:06.25  Ji Liping  1:06.52
Soni wins the event for the second successive time.

Water polo
World Aquatics Championships in Shanghai, China:
Men's tournament:
Quarterfinals (winners qualify for 2012 Olympics):
 9–8 
 9–4 
 9–6 
 10–6 
Classification 9–12 Semifinals:
 8–12 
 15–9 
13th place game:  9–7 
15th place game:  9–4

July 25, 2011 (Monday)

Cricket
India in England:
1st Test in London, day 5:  474/8d & 269/6d;  286 & 261 (96.3 overs; James Anderson 5/65). England win by 196 runs; lead 4-match series 1–0.
ICC Intercontinental Cup One-Day, round 1:
3rd Match in Nairobi:  210 (49.3 overs; Shoaib Sarwar 5/23);  119/8 (35/35 overs; Rajesh Bhudia 5/21). Kenya win by 66 runs (D/L).

Swimming
World Aquatics Championships in Shanghai, China:
Women's 100m butterfly:  Dana Vollmer  56.87  Alicia Coutts  56.94  Lu Ying  57.06
Vollmer wins her second world championship title.
Men's 50m butterfly:  César Cielo  23.10  Matt Targett  23.28  Geoff Huegill  23.35
Cielo wins his third world championship title.
Women's 200m individual medley:  Ye Shiwen  2:08.90  Alicia Coutts  2:09.00  Ariana Kukors  2:09.12
Men's 100m breaststroke:   Alexander Dale Oen  58.71  Fabio Scozzoli  59.42  Cameron van der Burgh  59.49
Dale Oen becomes the first Norwegian world champion in swimming.

Water polo
World Aquatics Championships in Shanghai, China:
Women's tournament:
Quarterfinals:
 7–9 
 12–10 
 14–12 
 7–9 
Classification 9–12 Semifinals:
 10–11 
 17–13 
15th place game:  5–6 
13th place game:  9–5

July 24, 2011 (Sunday)

Athletics
European Junior Championships in Tallinn, Estonia:
Men's 800m:  Pierre-Ambroise Bossé  1:47.14  Zan Rudolf  1:47.73  Johan Rogestedt  1:47.88
Men's 400m hurdles:  Varg Königsmark  49.70  Stef Vanhaeren  50.01  José Reynaldo Bencosme  50.30
Men's 3000m steeplechase:  Ilgizar Safiullin  8:37.94  Muhammet Emin Tan  8:46.74  Martin Grau  8:48.79
Men's 4 × 100 m relay:   (Vincent Michalet, Jimmy Vicaut, Jeffrey John, Ken Romain) 39.35   (Dannish Walker-Khan, Sam Watts, Adam Gemili, David Bolarinwa) 39.48   (Konrad Donczew, Kamil Supiński, Kamil Bijowski, Tomasz Kluczynski) 40.42
Men's 4 × 400 m relay:   (Michele Tricca, Paolo Danesini, Alberto Rontini, Marco Lorenzi) 3:06.46   (Evgeny Khokhlov, Radel Kashefrazov, Denis Nesmashnyy, Nikita Uglov) 3:07.47   (Königsmark, Lukas Schmitz, Lukas Hamich, Johannes Trefz) 3:08.56
Men's pole vault:  Emile Denecker  5.50m  Kévin Ménaldo  5.50m  Didac Salas  5.40m
Men's triple jump:  Alexander Yurchenko  16.31m  Murad Ibadullayev  16.25m  Georgi Tsonov  15.90m
Men's discus throw:  Lukas Weisshaidinger  63.83m  Danijel Furtula  63.54m  Benedikt Stienen  62.33m
Men's decathlon:  Kevin Mayer  8124 points  Matthias Brugger  7853  Johannes Hock  7806
Women's 1500m:  Amela Terzic  4:15.40  Ciara Mageean  4:16.82  Ioana Doaga  4:20.73
Women's 5000m:  Esma Aydemir  16:12.16  Emelia Gorecka  16:13.04  Annabel Gummow  16:14.62
Women's 400m hurdles:  Vera Rudakova  57.24  Aurélie Chaboudez  57.35  Maëva Contion  58.03
Women's 4 × 100 m relay:   (Alexandra Burghardt, Katharina Grompe, Tatjana Lofamakanda Pinto, Anna-Lena Freese) 43.42   (Oriana De Fazio, Irene Siragusa, Anna Bongiorni, Gloria Hooper) 44.52   (Marylyn Nwawulor, Bianca Williams, Jennie Batten, Jodie Williams) 45.00
Women's 4 × 400 m relay:   (Katie Kirk, Lucy James, Amelia Clifford, Kirsten Mcaslan) 3:35.29   (Patrycja Wyciszkiewicz, Malgorzata Holub, Justyna Swiety, Magdalena Gorzkowska) 3:35.35   (Sabrina Häfele, Stefanie Gotzhein, Kim Carina Schmidt, Christina Zwirner) 3:36.26
Women's high jump:  Mariya Kuchina  1.95m  Airinė Palšytė  1.91m  Nadja Kampschulte  1.88m
Women's long jump:  Lena Malkus  6.40m  Alina Rotaru  6.36m  Polina Yurchenko  6.11m
Women's javelin throw:  Liina Laasma  55.99m  Līna Mūze  55.83m  Laura Henkel  55.37m

Auto racing
Formula One:
 in Nürburg, Germany: (1) Lewis Hamilton  (McLaren–Mercedes) (2) Fernando Alonso  (Ferrari) (3) Mark Webber  (Red Bull–Renault)
Drivers' championship standings (after 10 of 19 races): (1) Sebastian Vettel  (Red Bull-Renault) 216 points (2) Webber 139 (3) Hamilton 134
IndyCar Series:
Honda Indy Edmonton in Edmonton: (1) Will Power  (Team Penske) (2) Hélio Castroneves  (Team Penske) (3) Dario Franchitti  (Chip Ganassi Racing)
Drivers' championship standings (after 11 of 18 races): (1) Franchitti 388 points (2) Power 350 (3) Scott Dixon  (Chip Ganassi Racing) 282

Baseball
Nippon Professional Baseball All-Star Series:
Game 3 in Sendai: Pacific League 5, Central League 0. Pacific League win series 2–1.
Hokkaido Nippon-Ham Fighters first baseman Atsunori Inaba is named game MVP with three hits and three RBIs.

Basketball
FIBA Europe Under-20 Championship in Bilbao, Spain:
Bronze medal game:   66–50 
Final:   70–82  
Spain win the title for the first time.

Cricket
India in England:
1st Test in London, day 4:  474/8d & 269/6d (71 overs; Matt Prior 103*);  286 & 80/1 (27 overs). India require another 378 runs with 9 wickets remaining.

Cycling
Grand Tours:
Tour de France, Stage 21:  Mark Cavendish   2h 27' 02"  Edvald Boasson Hagen  s.t.  André Greipel  s.t.
Cavendish wins the Champs-Élysées stage for the third straight year, further extending his record. His victory also secures the points classification for the first time.
Final general classification: (1) Cadel Evans   86h 12' 22" (2) Andy Schleck  + 1' 34" (3) Fränk Schleck  + 2' 30"
Evans becomes the first Australian to win a Grand Tour.
UCI World Tour standings (after 17 of 27 races): (1) Evans 574 points (2) Alberto Contador  471 (3) Philippe Gilbert  402

Diving
World Aquatics Championships in Shanghai, China:
Men's 10 m platform:  Qiu Bo  585.45  David Boudia  544.25  Sascha Klein  534.50
China win all ten titles.
Qiu wins his second title of the championships.

Football (soccer)
Copa América in Argentina:
Final in Buenos Aires:  3–0 
Uruguay win the title for a record 15th time.

Golf
Senior majors:
The Senior Open Championship in Surrey, England:
Leaderboard after final round (all USA): (1) Russ Cochran 276 (−12) (2) Mark Calcavecchia 278 (−10) (T3) Corey Pavin & Tom Watson 279 (−9)
Cochran wins his first senior major title.
PGA Tour:
RBC Canadian Open in Vancouver:
Winner: Sean O'Hair  276 (−4)PO
O'Hair defeats Kris Blanks  on the first playoff hole, to win his fourth PGA Tour title.
European Tour:
Nordea Scandinavian Masters in Upplands-Bro, Sweden:
Winner: Alexander Norén  273 (−15)
Norén wins his second title of the year, and third of his career.
LPGA Tour:
Evian Masters in Évian-les-Bains, France:
Winner: Ai Miyazato  273 (−15)
Miyazato wins her seventh LPGA Tour title.

Motorcycle racing
Moto GP:
United States Grand Prix in Laguna Seca, United States:
MotoGP: (1) Casey Stoner  (Honda) (2) Jorge Lorenzo  (Yamaha) (3) Dani Pedrosa  (Honda)
Riders' championship standings (after 10 of 18 races): (1) Stoner 193 points (2) Lorenzo 173 (3) Andrea Dovizioso  (Honda) 143

Snooker
Australian Goldfields Open in Bendigo, Australia:
Final: Stuart Bingham  9–8 Mark Williams 
Bingham wins his first ranking title.

Surfing
Men's World Tour:
Billabong Pro in Jeffreys Bay, South Africa: (1) Jordy Smith  (2) Mick Fanning  (3) Adrian Buchan  & Joel Parkinson 
Standings (after 4 of 11 events): (1) Parkinson 25,700 points (2) Smith 24,750 (3) Adriano De Souza  22,250

Swimming
World Aquatics Championships in Shanghai, China:
Men's 400m freestyle:  Park Tae-Hwan  3:42.04  Sun Yang  3:43.24  Paul Biedermann  3:44.14
Park wins the event for the second time.
Women's 400m freestyle:  Federica Pellegrini  4:01.97  Rebecca Adlington  4:04.01  Camille Muffat  4:04.06
Pellegrini wins the event for the second time and her third world championships title.
Women's 4 × 100 m freestyle relay:   (Inge Dekker, Ranomi Kromowidjojo, Marleen Veldhuis, Femke Heemskerk) 3:33.96   (Natalie Coughlin, Missy Franklin, Jessica Hardy, Dana Vollmer) 3:34.47   (Britta Steffen, Silke Lippok, Lisa Vitting, Daniela Schreiber) 3:36.05
The Dutch quartet win the event for the second successive time.
Men's 4 × 100 m freestyle relay:   (James Magnussen, Matt Targett, Matthew Abood, Eamon Sullivan) 3:11.00   (Alain Bernard, Jérémy Stravius, William Meynard, Fabien Gilot) 3:11.14   (Michael Phelps, Garrett Weber-Gale, Jason Lezak, Nathan Adrian) 3:11.96
Sullivan wins his second world championship title.

Tennis
ATP World Tour:
International German Open in Hamburg, Germany:
Final: Gilles Simon  def. Nicolás Almagro  6–4, 4–6, 6–4
Simon wins his second title of the year, and the ninth of his career.
Atlanta Championships in Atlanta, United States:
Final: Mardy Fish  def. John Isner  3–6, 7–6(6), 6–2
Fish defeats Isner in the final for the second consecutive year, to win his sixth ATP Tour title.
WTA Tour:
Baku Cup in Baku, Azerbaijan:
Final: Vera Zvonareva  def. Ksenia Pervak  6–1, 6–4
Zvonareva wins her second title of the year, and the twelfth of her career.

Water polo
World Aquatics Championships in Shanghai, China:
Men's tournament:
Playoff round:
 8–4 
 9–8 
 4–17 
 6–8 
Classification 13–16 Semifinals:
 8–7 
 7–4

July 23, 2011 (Saturday)

Athletics
European Junior Championships in Tallinn, Estonia:
Men's 200m:  David Bolarinwa  21.07  Pierre Vincent  21.22  Jeffrey John  21.24
Men's 1500m:  Adam Cotton  3:43.98  Thomas Solberg Eide  3:44.70  Alexander Schwab  3:44.82
Men's 5000m:  Gabriel Navarro  14:07.06  Bartosz Kowalczyk  14:07.17  Jonathan Hay  14:07.78
Men's 110m hurdles:  Jack Meredith  13.50  Andy Pozzi  13.57  Rahib Mammadov  13.78
Men's 10 km walk:  Hagen Pohle  40:43.73  Ihor Lyashchenko  41:10.43  Luís Alberto Amezcua  41:34.13
Men's high jump:  Nikita Anishchenkov  2.27m  Janick Klausen  2.25m  Gianmarco Tamberi  2.25m
Men's javelin throw:  Zigismunds Sirmais  81.53m  Marcin Krukowski  79.19m  Pavel Mialeshka  76.59m
Women's 200m:  Jodie Williams  22.94  Jamile Samuel  23.31  Jennifer Galais  23.55
Women's 800m:  Anastasiya Tkachuk  2:02.73  Rowena Cole  2:03.43  Ayvika Malanova  2:03.59
Women's 3000m:  Amela Terzic  9:17.61  Esma Aydemir  9:19.61  Lisa Jäsert  9:30.23
Women's 100m hurdles:  Nooralotta Neziri  13.34  Isabelle Pedersen  13.37  Ekaterina Bleskina  13.47
Women's 3000m steeplechase:  Gesa-Felicitas Krause  9:51.08  Gulshat Fazlitdinova  9:56.98  Elena Panaet  10:17.37
Women's pole vault:  Angelica Bengtsson  4.57m  Lilli Schnitzerling  4.20m  Natalia Demidenko  4.20m
Women's shot put:  Lena Urbaniak  16.31m  Anna Wloka  16.23m  Anna Rüh  16.01m
Women's hammer throw:  Barbara Špiler  67.06m  Kıvılcım Kaya  66.74m  Alexia Sedykh  65.02m

Auto racing
Nationwide Series:
Federated Auto Parts 300 in Gladeville, Tennessee: (1)  Carl Edwards (Ford; Roush Fenway Racing) (2)  Ricky Stenhouse Jr. (Ford; Roush Fenway Racing) (3)  Austin Dillon (Chevrolet; Kevin Harvick Incorporated)
Drivers' championship standings (after 20 of 34 races): (1)  Reed Sorenson (Chevrolet; Turner Motorsports) 702 points (2) Stenhouse Jr. 697 (3)  Elliott Sadler (Chevrolet; Kevin Harvick Incorporated) 688

Baseball
Nippon Professional Baseball All-Star Series:
Game 2 in Chiba: Pacific League 4, Central League 3. Series tied 1–1.
Saitama Seibu Lions third baseman Takeya Nakamura wins game MVP after hitting two home runs.

Basketball
WNBA All-Star Game in San Antonio: Eastern Conference 118, Western Conference 113
The Eastern Conference win their first All-Star Game since 2007.

Cricket
India in England:
1st Test in London, day 3:  474/8d & 5/0 (5 overs);  286 (95.5 overs; Rahul Dravid 103*). England lead by 193 runs with 10 wickets remaining.

Cycling
Grand Tours:
Tour de France, Stage 20:  Tony Martin  55' 33"  Cadel Evans  + 7"  Alberto Contador   + 1' 06"
General classification (after stage 20): (1) Evans  83h 45' 20" (2) Andy Schleck  + 1' 34" (3) Fränk Schleck  + 2' 30"

Diving
World Aquatics Championships in Shanghai, China:
Women's 3 m springboard:  Wu Minxia  380.85 points  He Zi  379.15  Jennifer Abel  365.10
Wu wins her second title of the championships and her sixth world title overall.

Equestrianism
Show jumping – Global Champions Tour:
7th Competition in Chantilly, Oise (CSI 5*):  Edwina Alexander  on Itot du Château  Luciana Diniz  on Lennox  Pénélope Leprevost  on Mylord Carthago
Standings (after 7 of 10 competitions): (1) Alexander 195 points (2) Ludger Beerbaum  186.5 (3) Diniz 186

Football (soccer)
2014 FIFA World Cup qualification (AFC), Second round, first leg:
 1–0 
 4–0 
 7–2 
 1–1 
 3–0 
 2–0 
 3–0 
 4–0 
 2–1  in Amman, Jordan
 3–0 
 2–0 
 5–3 
 4–0 
 3–0 
 9–0 
Copa América in Argentina:
Third-place match in La Plata:   4–1 
UEFA European Under-19 Championship in Romania (team in bold advances to semifinals):
Group A:
 2–1  in Mogoşoaia
 0–1  in Berceni
Standings (after 2 matches): Czech Republic 6 points, Republic of Ireland, Greece 3, Romania 0.
Group B:
 1–1  in Buftea
 0–4  in Chiajna
Standings (after 2 matches): Spain 6 points, Serbia 3, Turkey, Belgium 1.
 DFL-Supercup in Gelsenkirchen: Borussia Dortmund 0–0 (3–4 pen.) FC Schalke 04
Schalke win the Cup for the first time.

Golf
Senior majors:
The Senior Open Championship in Surrey, England:
Leaderboard after third round: (T1) Mark Calcavecchia , Russ Cochran  & David Frost  209 (−7)

Open water swimming
World Aquatics Championships in Shanghai, China:
Men's 25 km:  Petar Stoychev  5:10:39.8  Vladimir Dyatchin  5:11:15.6  Csaba Gercsák  5:11:18.1
Women's 25 km:  Ana Marcela Cunha  5:29:22.9  Angela Maurer  5:29:25.0  Alice Franco  5:29:30.8

Rugby union
Tri Nations Series:
 39–20  in Sydney

Snooker
Australian Goldfields Open in Bendigo, Australia, semi-finals:
Shaun Murphy  2–6 Stuart Bingham 
Bingham reaches his first ranking final.
Ken Doherty  2–6 Mark Williams

Synchronized swimming
World Aquatics Championships in Shanghai, China:
Team free routine:   (Anastasia Davydova, Natalia Ishchenko, Elvira Khasyanova, Svetlana Kolesnichenko, Daria Korobova, Aleksandra Patskevich, Alla Shishkina, Angelika Timanina) 98.620 points   (Chang Si, Fan Jiachen, Huang Xuechen, Jiang Tingting, Jiang Wenwen, Liu Ou, Luo Xi, Wu Yiwen) 96.580   (Clara Basiana, Alba María Cabello, Ona Carbonell, Margalida Crespí, Andrea Fuentes, Thaïs Henríquez, Paula Klamburg, Irene Montrucchio) 96.150
Russia win all seven events contested.
Ishchenko wins her sixth title of the championships and 15th world title overall.
Khasyanova wins her third title of the championships and eighth world title overall.
Davydova wins her third title of the championships and fifth world title overall.
Kolesnichenko, Korobova, Patskevich, Shishkina and Timanina win their third title of the championships.

Water polo
World Aquatics Championships in Shanghai, China:
Women's tournament:
Playoff round:
 14–6 
 9–10 
 26–4 
 6–15 
Classification 13–16 Semifinals:
 14–13 
 10–9

July 22, 2011 (Friday)

Athletics
Samsung Diamond League:
Herculis in Fontvieille, Monaco:
Men:
100m: Usain Bolt  9.88
800m: David Rudisha  1:42.61
1500m: Silas Kiplagat  3:30.47
5000m: Mo Farah  12:53.11
400m hurdles: Angelo Taylor  47.97
3000m steeplechase: Brimin Kipruto  7:53.64
Triple jump: Phillips Idowu  17.36m
Pole vault: Renaud Lavillenie  5.90m
Shot put: Reese Hoffa  21.25m
Women:
200m: Carmelita Jeter  22.20
400m: Amantle Montsho  49.71
1500m: Maryam Yusuf Jamal  4:00.59
100m hurdles: Sally Pearson  12.51
Long jump: Brittney Reese  6.82m
High jump: Blanka Vlašić  1.97m
Discus throw: Nadine Müller  65.90m
Javelin throw: Barbora Špotáková  69.45m
European Junior Championships in Tallinn, Estonia:
Men's 100m:  Jimmy Vicaut  10.07  Adam Gemili  10.41  David Bolarinwa  10.46
Men's 400m:  Marcell Deák-Nagy  45.42  Nikita Uglov  46.01  Michele Tricca  46.09
Men's long jump:  Sergey Morgunov  8.18m  Tomasz Jaszczuk  8.11m  Evgeny Antonov  7.83m
Men's hammer throw:  Quentin Bigot  78.45m  Serghei Marghiev  76.60m  Elias Håkansson  74.99m
Women's 100m:  Jodie Williams  11.18  Jamile Samuel  11.43  Tatjana Lofamakanda Pinto  11.48
Women's 400m:  Bianca Răzor  51.96  Yulia Yurenya  53.03  Madiea Ghafoor  53.73
Women's triple jump:  Yana Borodina  14.00m  Kristiina Mäkelä  13.67m  Ganna Aleksandrova  13.14m
Women's discus throw:  Shanice Craft  58.65m  Anna Rüh  58.10m  Viktoriya Klochko  54.03m
Women's heptathlon:  Dafne Schippers  6153 points  Sara Gambetta  6108  Laura Ikauniece  6063

Baseball
Nippon Professional Baseball All-Star Series:
Game 1 in Nagoya: Central League 9, Pacific League 4. Central League lead series 1–0.
Tokyo Yakult Swallows first baseman Kazuhiro Hatakeyama is named game MVP after hitting a game-winning three-run home run in the 5th inning.

Cricket
India in England:
1st Test in London, day 2:  474/8d (131.4 overs; Kevin Pietersen 202*, Praveen Kumar 5/106);  17/0 (6 overs). India trail by 457 runs with 10 wickets remaining in the 1st innings.

Cycling
Grand Tours:
Tour de France, Stage 19:  Pierre Rolland  3h 13' 25"  Samuel Sánchez  + 14"  Alberto Contador  + 23"
General classification (after stage 19): (1) Andy Schleck   82h 48' 43" (2) Fränk Schleck  + 53" (3) Cadel Evans  + 57"

Diving
World Aquatics Championships in Shanghai, China:
Men's 3 m springboard:  He Chong  554.30  Ilya Zakharov  508.95  Evgeny Kuznetsov  493.55
He wins the event for the second successive time, and third world title overall.

Golf
Senior majors:
The Senior Open Championship in Surrey, England:
Leaderboard after second round: (T1) Mark Calcavecchia , Lee Rinker  & Rod Spittle  137 (−7)

Open water swimming
World Aquatics Championships in Shanghai, China:
Men's 5 km:  Thomas Lurz  56:16.2  Spyridon Gianniotis  56:17.4  Evgeny Drattsev  56:18.5
Lurz wins the event for the fourth successive time, and fifth world title overall.
Women's 5 km:  Swann Oberson  1:00:39.7  Aurélie Muller  1:00:40.1  Ashley Twichell  1:00:40.2
Switzerland wins its first ever gold medal at a World Aquatics Championships.

Snooker
Australian Goldfields Open in Bendigo, Australia, quarter-finals:
Matthew Selt  3–5 Shaun Murphy 
Mark Allen  3–5 Stuart Bingham 
Mark Selby  3–5 Ken Doherty 
Dominic Dale  4–5 Mark Williams

Synchronized swimming
World Aquatics Championships in Shanghai, China:
Duet free routine:  Natalia Ishchenko/Svetlana Romashina  98.200 points  Jiang Tingting/Jiang Wenwen  96.810  Ona Carbonell/Andrea Fuentes  96.500
Ishchenko wins the event for the second successive time, and her fifth title of the championships and 14th world title overall.
Romashina wins the event for the second successive time, and her third title of the championships and 10th world title overall.

Water polo
World Aquatics Championships in Shanghai, China (teams in bold advance to quarterfinals, teams in italic advance to playoff round):
Men's tournament:
Group A:
 12–11 
 5–16 
Final standings: Hungary 6 points, Montenegro 4, Spain 2, Kazakhstan 0.
Group B:
 12–9 
 14–10 
Final standings: Serbia 6 points, Australia 4, Romania 2, China 0.
Group C:
 9–13 
 7–18 
Final standings: Croatia 6 points, Canada 4, Japan 2, Brazil 0.
Group D:
 20–3 
 7–6 
Final standings: Italy 6 points, Germany 4, United States 2, South Africa 0.

July 21, 2011 (Thursday)

Athletics
European Junior Championships in Tallinn, Estonia:
Men's 10,000m:  Gabriel Navarro  30:02.18  Emmanuel Lejeune  31:35.19  Szymon Kulka  31:50.13
Men's shot put:  Krzysztof Brzozowski  20.92m  Daniele Secci  20.45m  Christian Jagusch  19.80m
Women's 10 km walk (all RUS):  Elena Lashmanova 42:59.48 (WJR)  Svetlana Vasileva 44:52.98  Anna Ermin 46:49.00

Cricket
India in England:
1st Test in London, day 1:  127/2 (49.2 overs); .

Cycling
Grand Tours:
Tour de France, Stage 18:  Andy Schleck  6h 07' 56"  Fränk Schleck  + 2' 07"  Cadel Evans  + 2' 15"
General classification (after stage 18): (1) Thomas Voeckler   79h 34' 06" (2) Andy Schleck  + 15" (3) Fränk Schleck + 1' 08"

Diving
World Aquatics Championships in Shanghai, China:
Women's 10 m platform:  Chen Ruolin  405.30  Hu Yadan  394.00  Paola Espinosa  377.15
Chen wins her second title of the championships and fourth world title overall.

Football (soccer)
UEFA European Under-19 Championship in Romania:
Group B:  4–1  in Mogoşoaia
UEFA Europa League Second qualifying round, second leg (first leg scores in parentheses):
Irtysh Pavlodar  0–2 (1–1)  Metalurgist Rustavi. Metalurgist Rustavi win 3–1 on aggregate.
Mika  0–1 (0–1)  Vålerenga. Vålerenga win 2–0 on aggregate.
Gaz Metan Mediaș  2–0 (0–1)  KuPS. Gaz Metan Mediaș win 2–1 on aggregate.
Vojvodina  1–3 (2–0)  Vaduz. 3–3 on aggregate; Vaduz win on away goals.
Ventspils  3–2 (1–0)  Shakhtyor Soligorsk. Ventspils win 4–2 on aggregate.
Khazar Lankaran  0–0 (1–3)  Maccabi Tel Aviv. Maccabi Tel Aviv win 3–1 on aggregate.
Levadia Tallinn  0–1 (0–0)  Differdange 03. Differdange 03 win 1–0 on aggregate.
Elfsborg  3–0 (1–1)  Sūduva Marijampolė. Elfsborg win 4–1 on aggregate.
Sheriff Tiraspol  0–0 (0–1)  Željezničar. Željezničar win 1–0 on aggregate.
Aktobe  0–0 (1–1)  Kecskemét. 1–1 on aggregate; Aktobe win on away goals.
Honka  0–2 (0–1)  Häcken. Häcken win 3–0 on aggregate.
Qarabağ  0–0 (1–1)  EB/Streymur. 1–1 on aggregate; Qarabağ win on away goals.
Bnei Yehuda  2–0 (2–0)  Sant Julià. Bnei Yehuda win 4–0 on aggregate.
Varaždin  3–1 (1–1)  Iskra-Stal. Varaždin win 4–2 on aggregate.
Vorskla Poltava  3–0 (2–0)  Glentoran. Vorskla Poltava win 5–0 on aggregate.
Sarajevo  2–0 (0–0)  Örebro. Sarajevo win 2–0 on aggregate.
Dinamo Tbilisi  5–0 (1–2)  Llanelli. Dinamo Tbilisi win 6–2 on aggregate.
AEK Larnaca  1–0 (8–0)  Floriana. AEK Larnaca win 9–0 on aggregate.
Spartak Trnava  3–1 (0–0)  Tirana. Spartak Trnava win 3–1 on aggregate.
Aalesund  3–1 (a.e.t.) (1–2)  Ferencváros. Aalesund win 4–3 on aggregate.
Red Bull Salzburg  0–0 (4–1)  Liepājas Metalurgs. Red Bull Salzburg win 4–1 on aggregate.
Gagra  2–0 (0–3)  Anorthosis. Anorthosis win 3–2 on aggregate.
Tromsø  0–3 (1–1)  Paks. Paks win 4–1 on aggregate.
Midtjylland  5–2 (3–1)  The New Saints. Midtjylland win 8–3 on aggregate.
Lokomotiv Sofia  3–2 (0–0)  Metalurg Skopje. Lokomotiv Sofia win 3–2 on aggregate.
Žilina  2–0 (0–3)  KR Reykjavík. KR Reykjavík win 3–2 on aggregate.
Thun  2–1 (0–0)  Vllaznia Shkodër. Thun win 2–1 on aggregate.
Gaziantepspor  4–1 (1–1)  Minsk. Gaziantepspor win 5–2 on aggregate.
ADO Den Haag  2–0 (3–2)  Tauras Tauragė. ADO Den Haag win 5–2 on aggregate.
Rabotnički  3–0 (1–0)  Juvenes/Dogana. Rabotnički win 4–0 on aggregate.
Jablonec  5–1 (2–0)  Flamurtari Vlorë. Jablonec win 7–1 on aggregate.
Olympiakos Volou  1–1 (1–0)  Rad. Olympiakos Volou win 2–1 on aggregate.
Westerlo  0–0 (1–0)  TPS. Westerlo win 1–0 on aggregate.
Fulham  4–0 (3–1)  Crusaders. Fulham win 7–1 on aggregate.
Split  3–1 (2–1)  Domžale. Split win 5–2 on aggregate.
Bohemians  1–1 (0–2)  Olimpija Ljubljana. Olimpija Ljubljana win 3–1 on aggregate.
Dundee United  3–2 (0–1)  Śląsk Wrocław. 3–3 on aggregate, Śląsk Wrocław win on away goals.
St Patrick's Athletic  2–0 (1–2)  Shakhter Karagandy. St Patrick's Athletic win 3–2 on aggregate.
Nacional  2–0 (1–1)  FH. Nacional win 3–1 on aggregate.
Austria Wien  2–0 (3–0)  Rudar Pljevlja. Austria Wien win 5–0 on aggregate.

Golf
Senior majors:
The Senior Open Championship in Surrey, England:
Leaderboard after first round: (T1) Mark Calcavecchia , Mike Harwood  & Mark McNulty  68 (−4)

Open water swimming
World Aquatics Championships in Shanghai, China:
Team:  Andrew Gemmell, Ashley Twichell, Sean Ryan  57:00.6  Melissa Gorman, Ky Hurst, Rhys Mainstone  57:01.8  Isabelle Härle, Thomas Lurz, Jan Wolfgarten  57:44.2

Snooker
Australian Goldfields Open in Bendigo, Australia, Last 16:
David Gilbert  2–5 Mark Williams 
Marcus Campbell  1–5 Mark Allen 
Mark Selby  5–3 Mark Davis 
Tom Ford  0–5 Stuart Bingham 
Neil Robertson  4–5 Dominic Dale 
Liang Wenbo  4–5 Ken Doherty

Synchronized swimming
World Aquatics Championships in Shanghai, China:
Free routine combination:   (Anastasia Davydova, Mariya Gromova, Natalia Ishchenko, Elvira Khasyanova, Svetlana Kolesnichenko, Daria Korobova, Aleksandra Patskevich, Svetlana Romashina, Alla Shishkina, Angelika Timanina) 98.470   (Chang Si, Chen Xiaojun, Fan Jiachen, Guo Li, Huang Xuechen, Liu Ou, Luo Xi, Sun Wenyan, Wu Yiwen, Yu Lele) 96.390   (Genevieve Belanger, Marie-Pier Boudreau Gagnon, Stéphanie Durocher, Jo-Annie Fortin, Chloé Isaac, Stéphanie Leclair, Tracy Little, Élise Marcotte, Karine Thomas, Valerie Welsh) 96.150
Ishchenko wins her fourth title of the championships and 13th world title overall.
Romashina wins her second title of the championships and ninth world title overall.
Khasyanova wins her second title of the championships and eighth world title overall.
Davydova wins her second title of the championships and fourth world title overall.
Gromova, Kolesnichenko, Korobova, Patskevich, Shishkina and Timanina win their second title of the championships.

Water polo
World Aquatics Championships in Shanghai, China (teams in bold advance to quarterfinals, teams in italic advance to playoff round):
Women's tournament:
Group A:
 9–9 
 4–14 
Final standings: United States 5 points, Netherlands 4, Hungary 3, Kazakhstan 0.
Group B:
 27–2 
 4–11 
Final standings: Canada 6 points, Australia 4, New Zealand 2, Uzbekistan 0.
Group C:
 4–12 
 6–5 
Final standings: Greece 6 points, Russia 4, Spain 2, Brazil 0.
Group D:
 9–9 
 10–9 
Final standings: Italy 6 points, China 4, Cuba, South Africa 1.

July 20, 2011 (Wednesday)

Cycling
Grand Tours:
Tour de France, Stage 17:  Edvald Boasson Hagen  4h 18' 00"  Bauke Mollema  + 40"  Sandy Casar  + 50"
General classification (after stage 17): (1) Thomas Voeckler   73h 23' 49" (2) Cadel Evans  + 1' 18" (3) Fränk Schleck  + 1' 22"

Football (soccer)
Copa América in Argentina:
Semifinals in Mendoza:  0–0 (5–3 pen.) 
Paraguay reach the final for the first time since 1979.
UEFA European Under-19 Championship in Romania:
Group A:
 1–2  in Buftea
 1–3  in Chiajna
Group B:
 2–0  in Berceni
 1–0  in Mogoşoaia — match abandoned after 15 minutes; rescheduled for 21 July.
UEFA Champions League Second qualifying round, second leg (first leg scores in parentheses):
APOEL  4–0 (2–0)  Skënderbeu Korçë. APOEL win 6–0 on aggregate.
Dacia Chişinău  2–0 (0–3)  Zestafoni. Zestafoni win 3–2 on aggregate.
Videoton  3–2 (0–2)  Sturm Graz. Sturm Graz win 4–3 on aggregate.
Borac Banja Luka  3–2 (1–5)  Maccabi Haifa. Maccabi Haifa win 7–4 on aggregate.
Breiðablik  2–0 (0–5)  Rosenborg. Rosenborg win 5–2 on aggregate.

Golf
The LPGA announces that the Evian Masters will become that tour's fifth major championship effective in 2013. The event, already a Ladies European Tour major, will be renamed the Evian Championship when it becomes an LPGA major.

Open water swimming
World Aquatics Championships in Shanghai, China:
Men's 10 km:  Spyridon Gianniotis  1:54:24.7  Thomas Lurz  1:54:27.2  Sergey Bolshakov  1:54:31.8

Snooker
Australian Goldfields Open in Bendigo, Australia:
Last 32:
Stephen Maguire  2–5 Ken Doherty 
Mark Williams  5–2 Barry Pinches 
Mark Selby  5–3 Joe Perry 
Matthew Stevens  4–5 Liang Wenbo 
Ding Junhui  2–5 Stuart Bingham 
Last 16: Matthew Selt  5–1 Stephen Hendry

Synchronized swimming
World Aquatics Championships in Shanghai, China:
Solo free routine:   Natalia Ishchenko  98.550 points  Andrea Fuentes  96.520  Sun Wenyan  95.840
Ishchenko wins the event for the second successive time, and her third title of the championships and 12th world title overall.

Water polo
World Aquatics Championships in Shanghai, China:
Men's tournament:
Group A:
 7–9 
 16–5 
Standings (after 2 games): Hungary 4 points, Spain, Montenegro 2, Kazakhstan 0.
Group B:
 12–5 
 12–7 
Standings (after 2 games): Serbia, Australia 4 points, Romania, China 0.
Group C:
 4–11 
 11–13 
Standings (after 2 games): Croatia 4 points, Canada, Japan 2, Brazil 0.
Group D:
 8–16 
 5–8 
Standings (after 2 games): Italy, Germany 4 points, United States, South Africa 0.

July 19, 2011 (Tuesday)

Cycling
Grand Tours:
Tour de France, Stage 16:  Thor Hushovd  3h 31' 38"  Edvald Boasson Hagen  s.t.  Ryder Hesjedal  + 2"
General classification (after stage 16): (1) Thomas Voeckler   69h 00' 56" (2) Cadel Evans  + 1' 45" (3) Fränk Schleck  + 1' 49"

Diving
World Aquatics Championships in Shanghai, China:
Women's 1 m springboard:  Shi Tingmao  318.65 points  Wang Han  310.20  Tania Cagnotto  295.45
Men's 3 m synchro springboard:  Qin Kai / Luo Yutong  463.98 points  Ilya Zakharov / Evgeny Kuznetsov  451.89  Yahel Castillo / Julián Sánchez  437.61
Qin wins the event for the third successive time and his fifth world championship title.
Luo wins his second world championship title.

Fencing
European Championships in Sheffield, United Kingdom:
Men's sabre team:   (Aldo Montano, Diego Occhuizzi, Gianpiero Pastore, Luigi Tarantino)   (Max Hartung, Björn Hübner, Nicolas Limbach, Benedikt Wagner)   (Pavel Bykov, Nikolay Kovalev, Veniamin Reshetnikov, Aleksey Yakimenko)
Women's épée team:   (Simona Alexandru, Ana Maria Brânză, Loredana Iordăchioiu, Anca Măroiu)   (Violetta Kolobova, Tatiana Logunova, Lyubov Shutova, Anna Sivkova)   (Sarah Daninthe, Laura Flessel-Colovic, Joséphine Jacques-André-Coquin, Maureen Nisima)

Football (soccer)
Copa América in Argentina:
Semifinals in La Plata:  0–2 
Uruguay reach the final for the first time since 1999.
UEFA Champions League Second qualifying round, second leg (first leg scores in parentheses):
Flora Tallinn  0–0 (0–1)  Shamrock Rovers. Shamrock Rovers win 1–0 on aggregate.
F91 Dudelange  1–3 (0–2)  Maribor. Maribor win 5–1 on aggregate.
Tobol Kostanay  1–1 (0–2)  Slovan Bratislava. Slovan Bratislava win 3–1 on aggregate.
Neftchi Baku  0–0 (0–3)  Dinamo Zagreb. Dinamo Zagreb win 3–0 on aggregate.
Ekranas  1–0 (3–2)  Valletta. Ekranas win 4–2 on aggregate.
HJK Helsinki  10–0 (3–0)  Bangor City. HJK Helsinki win 13–0 on aggregate.
BATE Borisov  2–0 (1–1)  Linfield. BATE Borisov win 3–1 on aggregate.
Litex Lovech  3–0 (2–1)  Mogren. Litex Lovech win 5–1 on aggregate.
HB Tórshavn  1–1 (0–2)  Malmö FF. Malmö FF win 3–1 on aggregate.
Viktoria Plzeň  5–1 (4–0)  Pyunik. Viktoria Plzeň win 9–1 on aggregate.
Wisła Kraków  2–0 (1–0)  Skonto. Wisła Kraków win 3–0 on aggregate.
Škendija  0–1 (0–4)  Partizan. Partizan win 5–0 on aggregate.

Open water swimming
World Aquatics Championships in Shanghai, China:
Women's 10 km:  Keri-anne Payne  2:01:58.1  Martina Grimaldi  2:01:59.9  Marianna Lymperta  2:02:01.8
Payne wins the title for the second successive time.

Snooker
Australian Goldfields Open in Bendigo, Australia:
Last 32:
Dominic Dale  5–2 Steve Mifsud 
John Higgins  4–5 Matthew Selt 
Ali Carter  3–5 Marcus Campbell 
Neil Robertson  5–2 Nigel Bond 
Mark Allen  5–3 Ryan Day 
Last 16: Rory McLeod  1–5 Shaun Murphy

Synchronized swimming
World Aquatics Championships in Shanghai, China:
Team technical routine:   (Anastasia Davydova, Mariya Gromova, Elvira Khasyanova, Svetlana Kolesnichenko, Daria Korobova, Aleksandra Patskevich, Alla Shishkina, Angelika Timanina) 98.300 points   (Chang Si, Huang Xuechen, Jiang Tingting, Jiang Wenwen, Liu Ou, Luo Xi, Sun Wenyan, Wu Yiwen) 96.800   (Clara Basiana, Alba María Cabello, Ona Carbonell, Margalida Crespí, Andrea Fuentes, Thaïs Henríquez, Paula Klamburg, Cristina Salvador) 96.000

Water polo
World Aquatics Championships in Shanghai, China:
Women's tournament:
Group A:
 7–16 
 13–3 
Standings (after 2 games): Netherlands, United States 3 points, Hungary 2, Kazakhstan 0.
Group B:
 6–22 
 12–4 
Standings (after 2 games): Canada 4 points, Australia, New Zealand 2, Uzbekistan 0.
Group C:
 8–18 
 8–11 
Standings (after 2 games): Russia, Greece 4 points, Spain, Brazil 0.
Group D:
 18–2 
 19–6 
Standings (after 2 games): China, Italy 4 points, Cuba, South Africa 0.

July 18, 2011 (Monday)

Diving
World Aquatics Championships in Shanghai, China:
Men's 1 m springboard:  Li Shixin  463.90 points  He Min  444.00  Pavlo Rozenberg  436.50
Women's 10 m synchro platform:  Wang Hao/Chen Ruolin  362.58 points  Alex Croak/Melissa Wu  325.92  Christin Steuer/Nora Subschinski  316.29
Chen wins the event for the third successive time.

Fencing
European Championships in Sheffield, United Kingdom:
Men's épée team:   (Yannick Borel, Gauthier Grumier, Ronan Gustin, Jean-Michel Lucenay)   (Gábor Boczkó, Géza Imre, András Rédli, Péter Somfai)   (Anton Avdeev, Sergey Khodos, Pavel Sukhov, Alexey Tikhomirov)
Women's foil team:   (Elisa Di Francisca, Arianna Errigo, Ilaria Salvatori, Valentina Vezzali)   (Inna Deriglazova, Larisa Korobeynikova, Yevgeniya Lamonova, Aida Shanaeva)   (Sandra Bingenheimer, Carolin Golubytskyi, Anja Schache, Katja Wächter)

Snooker
Australian Goldfields Open in Bendigo, Australia, last 32:
David Gilbert  5–1 James Mifsud 
Shaun Murphy  5–3 Andrew Higginson 
Jamie Cope  3–5 Tom Ford 
Judd Trump  3–5 Mark Davis 
Stephen Hendry  5–3 Martin Gould 
Peter Ebdon  3–5 Rory McLeod

Synchronized swimming
World Aquatics Championships in Shanghai, China:
Duet technical routine:  Natalia Ishchenko/Svetlana Romashina  98.200 points  Huang Xuechen/Liu Ou  96.500  Ona Carbonell/Andrea Fuentes  95.400
Ishchenko wins her second title of the championships and eleventh world title overall.
Romashina wins the event for the second successive time and her eighth world title overall.

Water polo
World Aquatics Championships in Shanghai, China:
Men's tournament:
Group A:
 11–10 
 5–18 
Group B:
 8–9 
 17–5 
Group C:
 5–14 
 5–11 
Group D:
 7–9 
 17–1

July 17, 2011 (Sunday)

Athletics
European U23 Championships in Ostrava, Czech Republic:
Men's 1500m:  Florian Carvalho  3:50.42  James Shane  3:50.58  David Bustos  3:50.59
Men's 3000m steeplechase:  Sebastián Martos  8:35.35  Abdelaziz Merzougui  8:36.21  Alexandru Ghinea  8:38.51
Men's 4 × 100 metres relay:   (Michael Tumi, Francesco Basciani, Davide Manenti, Delmas Obou) 39.05   (Andrew Robertson, Kieran Showler-Davis, Richard Kilty, Daniel Talbot) 39.10   (Florian Hübner, Maximilian Kessler, Robin Erewa, Felix Göltl) 39.19
Men's 4 × 400 metres relay:   (Nigel Levine, Thomas Phillips, Jamie Bowie, Luke Lennon-Ford) 3:03.53   (Michal Pietrzak, Jakub Krzewina, Lukasz Krawczuk, Mateusz Fórmanski) 3:03.62   (Aleksey Kenig, Anton Volobuev, Artem Vazhov, Vladimir Krasnov) 3:04.01
Men's 20km walk:  Petr Bogatyrev  1:24:20  Dawid Tomala  1:24:21  Denis Strelkov  1:24:25
Men's discus throw:  Lawrence Okoye  60.70m  Mykyta Nesterenko  59.67m  Fredrik Amundgård  59.42m
Men's hammer throw:  Paweł Fajdek  78.54m  Javier Cienfuegos  73.03m  Aleh Dubitski  72.52m
Men's high jump:  Bohdan Bondarenko  2.30m  Sergey Mudrov  2.30m  Miguel Ángel Sancho  2.21m
Men's triple jump:  Sheryf El-Sheryf  17.72m  Aleksey Fyodorov  16.85m  Yuriy Kovalyov  16.82m
Women's 1500m:  Elena Arzhakova  4:20.55  Tuğba Karakaya  4:20.80  Corinna Harrer  4:21.52
Women's 5000m:  Layes Abdullayeva  15:29.47  Yekaterina Gorbunova  15:45.14  Stevie Stockton  15:58.51
Women's 4 × 100 metres relay:   (Olena Yanovska, Darya Pizhankova, Viktoriya Pyatachenko, Ulyana Lepska) 44.00   (Yekaterina Filatova, Alena Tamkova, Yekaterina Kuzina, Nina Argunova) 44.14   (Yariatou Toure, Sarah Goujon, Orlann Ombissa, Cornnelly Calydon) 44.26
Women's 4 × 400 metres relay:   (Yevgeniya Subbotina, Yekaterina Yefimova, Yuliya Terekhova, Olga Topilskaya) 3:27.72   (Kateryna Plyashechuk, Alina Lohvynenko, Hanna Yaroshchuk, Yuilya Olishevska) 3:30.13   (Clemence Sorgnard, Marie Gayot, Elea-Mariama Diarra, Florie Guei) 3:31.73
Women's 20km walk:  Tatyana Mineyeva  1:31:42  Nina Okhotnikova  1:31:51  Julia Takacs  1:31:55
Women's long jump:  Darya Klishina  7.05m  Ivana Španović  6.74m  Sosthene Moguenara  6.74m
Women's pole vault:  Holly Bleasdale  4.55m  Katerina Stefanidi  4.45m  Annika Roloff  4.40m
Women's heptathlon:  Grit Šadeiko  6134 points  Kateřina Cachová  6123  Yana Maksimava  6075
Central American and Caribbean Championships in Mayagüez, Puerto Rico:
Men's 110m hurdles:  Eric Keddo  13.49  Hector Cotto  13.54  Paulo Villar  13.60
Men's 200m:  Michael Mathieu  20.60  Rondel Sorrillo  20.64  Jason Young  20.78
Men's 800m:  Andy González  1:48.15  Moise Joseph  1:48.94  Joel Mejia  1:49.67
Men's 4 × 400 metres relay:   (Latoya Williams, Avard Moncur, Mathieu, Ramon Miller) 3:01.33   (Lalonde Gordon, Jarrin Solomon, Deon Lendore, Renny Quow) 3:01.65   (Dwight Mullings, Riker Hylton, Dawayne Barrett, Leford Green) 3:02.00
Men's 20 km walk:  Allan Segura  1:28:56.08  Joe Bonilla  1:40:18.94  Luis Ángel López  1:40:34.16
Men's half-marathon:  Luis Collazo  1:07:08  Luis Rivera  1:08:38  Oscar Ceron  1:09:17
Men's high jump:  Trevor Barry  2.28m  James Grayman  2.25m  Darwin Edwards  2.25m
Men's triple jump:  Samir Layne  17.09m  Osniel Tosca  16.22m  Wilbert Walker  16.01m
Women's 100m hurdles:  Vonette Dixon  12.77  Brigitte Merlano  12.89  Lina Flórez  12.94
Women's 200m:  Nivea Smith  22.80  Anthonique Strachan  22.90  Anastasia Le-Roy  23.13
Women's 800m:  Gabriela Medina  2:01.50  Rosemary Almanza  2:02.23  Natoya Goule  2:02.83
Women's 3000m steeplechase:  Korene Hinds  9:54.67  Beverly Ramos  9:58.11  Sara Prieto  10:42.65
Women's 4 × 400 metres relay:   (Andrea Sutherland, Shereefa Lloyd, Natoya Goule, Patricia Hall) 3:29.86   (Raysa Sanchez, Diana Taylor, Rosa Fabian, Yolanda Osana) 3:34.73   (Alena Harriman, Magnolia Howell, Josanne Lucas, Afiya Walker) 3:34.84
Women's 10 km walk:  Milanggela Rosales  47:19.91  Sandra Galvis  48:23.59  Wilane Cuebas  55:52.53
Women's half-marathon:  Michelle Coira  1:21:07  Maria del Pilar Diaz  1:21:45  Maria Montilla  1:22:20
Women's javelin throw:  Fresa Nuñez  54.29m  Flor Ruiz  54.02m  Abigail Gomez  53.13m
Women's long jump:  Bianca Stuart  6.81m  Arantxa King  6.47m  Yvonne Trevino  6.30m
Women's shot put:  Cleopatra Borel-Brown  19.00m  Angela Rivas  17.12m  Annie Alexander  17.05m
Women's heptathlon:  Gretchen Quintana  5704 points  Francia Manzanillo  5601  Peaches Roach  5589

Auto racing
Sprint Cup Series:
Lenox Industrial Tools 301 in Loudon, New Hampshire: (1)  Ryan Newman (Chevrolet; Stewart Haas Racing) (2)  Tony Stewart (Chevrolet; Stewart Haas Racing) (3)  Denny Hamlin (Toyota; Joe Gibbs Racing)
Drivers' championship standings (after 19 of 36 races): (1)  Carl Edwards (Ford; Roush Fenway Racing) 652 points (2)  Jimmie Johnson (Chevrolet; Hendrick Motorsports) 645 (3)  Kurt Busch (Dodge; Penske Racing) 641
World Touring Car Championship:
Race of UK in Castle Donington, Leicestershire:
Race 1: (1) Yvan Muller  (Chevrolet; Chevrolet Cruze) (2) Robert Huff  (Chevrolet; Chevrolet Cruze) (3) Alain Menu  (Chevrolet; Chevrolet Cruze)
Race 2: (1) Muller (2) Huff (3) Franz Engstler  (Liqui Moly Team Engstler; BMW 320 TC)
Drivers' championship standings (after 7 of 12 rounds): (1) Huff 263 points (2) Muller 248 (3) Menu 192

Basketball
FIBA Europe Under-20 Championship for Women in Novi Sad, Serbia:
Bronze medal game:   67–65 
Final:   53–62  
Spain win the title for the second time.

Cycling
Grand Tours:
Tour de France, Stage 15:  Mark Cavendish   4h 20' 24"  Tyler Farrar  s.t.  Alessandro Petacchi  s.t.
General classification (after stage 15): (1) Thomas Voeckler   65h 24' 34" (2) Fränk Schleck   + 1' 49" (3) Cadel Evans  + 2' 06"

Diving
World Aquatics Championships in Shanghai, China:
Men's 10 m synchro platform:  Qiu Bo/Huo Liang  480.03 points  Patrick Hausding/Sascha Klein  443.01  Oleksandr Gorshkovozov/Oleksandr Bondar  435.36
Huo wins the event for the third successive time.

Equestrianism
CHIO Aachen in Aachen, Germany:
Dressage – Grand Prix Freestyle (CDIO 5*):  Matthias Alexander Rath  on Totilas  Steffen Peters  on Ravel  Adelinde Cornelissen  on Parzival
Show jumping – Grand Prix (CSIO 5*):  Janne Friederike Meyer  on Lambrasco  Kevin Staut  on Silvana  Andreas Kreuzer  on Chacco-Blue

Fencing
European Championships in Sheffield, United Kingdom:
Men's foil team:   (Valerio Aspromonte, Giorgio Avola, Andrea Baldini, Andrea Cassarà)   (Brice Guyart, Erwann Le Péchoux, Marcel Marcilloux, Victor Sintès)   (Aleksey Cheremisinov, Renal Ganeev, Dmitry Rigin, Artem Sedov)
Women's sabre team:   (Ilaria Bianco, Paola Guarneri, Gioia Marzocca, Irene Vecchi)   (Olha Kharlan, Olena Khomrova, Halyna Pundyk, Olha Zhovnir)   (Yekaterina Dyachenko, Dina Galiakbarova, Yuliya Gavrilova, Sofiya Velikaya)

Football (soccer)
FIFA Women's World Cup in Germany:
Final in Frankfurt:   2–2 (3–1 pen.)  
Japan become the first Asian team to win the World Cup.
2014 FIFA World Cup qualification (CONCACAF) First round, second leg (first leg score in parentheses):
 3–1 (5–2) . Belize win 8–3 on aggregate.
Copa América in Argentina:
Quarterfinals:
 0–0 (0–2 pen.)  in La Plata
 1–2  in San Juan
CAF Champions League Group stage, matchday 1:
Group A: Enyimba  2–2  Al-Hilal
Group B: Al-Ahly  3–3  Wydad Casablanca
CAF Confederation Cup Group stage, matchday 1:
Group A: ASEC Mimosas  1–1  Club Africain

Golf
Men's majors:
The Open Championship in Sandwich, Kent, United Kingdom:
Leaderboard after final round: (1) Darren Clarke  275 (−5) (T2) Dustin Johnson  & Phil Mickelson  278 (−2)
Clarke becomes the fourth Northern Irish player to win a major, after Fred Daly at the 1947 Open Championship, Graeme McDowell at the 2010 U.S. Open & Rory McIlroy at the 2011 U.S. Open.
PGA Tour:
Viking Classic in Madison, Mississippi:
Winner: Chris Kirk  266 (−22)
Kirk wins his first PGA Tour title.

Horse racing
Canadian Thoroughbred Triple Crown:
Prince of Wales Stakes in Fort Erie, Ontario:  Pender Harbour (trainer: Mike De Paulo; jockey: Luis Contreras)  Bowman's Causeway (trainer: Chad Brown; jockey: Eurico Rosa da Silva)  Oh Canada (trainer: Bob Tiller; jockey: Krista Carignan)

Motorcycle racing
Moto GP:
German Grand Prix in Hohenstein-Ernstthal, Germany:
MotoGP: (1) Dani Pedrosa  (Honda) (2) Jorge Lorenzo  (Yamaha) (3) Casey Stoner  (Honda)
Riders' championship standings (after 9 of 18 races): (1) Stoner 168 points (2) Lorenzo 153 (3) Andrea Dovizioso  (Honda) 132
Moto2: (1) Marc Márquez  (Suter) (2) Stefan Bradl  (Kalex) (3) Alex de Angelis  (Motobi)
Riders' championship standings (after 9 of 17 races): (1) Bradl 167 points (2) Márquez 120 (3) Simone Corsi  (FTR) 84
125cc: (1) Héctor Faubel  (Aprilia) (2) Johann Zarco  (Derbi) (3) Maverick Viñales  (Aprilia)
Faubel and Zarco finish the race in a dead heat, with Faubel awarded victory by virtue of having set a faster race lap than Zarco.
Riders' championship standings (after 9 of 17 races): (1) Nicolás Terol  (Aprilia) 166 points (2) Zarco 134 (3) Viñales 122

Synchronized swimming
World Aquatics Championships in Shanghai, China:
Solo technical routine:  Natalia Ishchenko  98.300 points  Huang Xuechen  96.500  Andrea Fuentes  95.300
Ishchenko wins the event for the third successive time, and her tenth world title overall.

Snooker
World Cup in Bangkok, Thailand:
Semi-finals:
Wales  1–4 
Hong Kong  3–4 
Final: China  4–2 
China win the title for the first time.

Tennis
ATP World Tour:
MercedesCup in Stuttgart, Germany:
Final: Juan Carlos Ferrero  def. Pablo Andújar  6–4, 6–0
Ferrero wins his 16th career title.
SkiStar Swedish Open in Båstad, Sweden:
Final: Robin Söderling  def. David Ferrer  6–2, 6–2
Söderling wins the title for the second time in three years, winning his fourth title of the year and tenth of his career.
WTA Tour:
Internazionali Femminili di Palermo in Palermo, Italy:
Final: Anabel Medina Garrigues   def. Polona Hercog  6–3, 6–2.
Medina Garrigues wins her second title of the year and 11th of her career. She wins the event for the fifth time.
Gastein Ladies in Bad Gastein, Austria:
Final: María José Martínez Sánchez  def. Patricia Mayr-Achleitner  6–0, 7–5
Martínez Sánchez wins her fourth career title.

Triathlon
ITU World Championships, Leg 4 in Hamburg, Germany:
Women (all AUS):  Emma Moffatt 1:53:37  Emma Jackson 1:53.44  Emma Snowsill 1:53:44
Standings (after 4 of 6 events): (1) Bárbara Riveros Díaz  2498 points (2) Paula Findlay  2400 (3) Andrea Hewitt  2318

Volleyball
Men's European League Final Four in Košice, Slovakia:
Bronze medal match:   3–0 
Final:   2–3  
Slovakia win the title for the second time.

Water polo
World Aquatics Championships in Shanghai, China:
Women's tournament:
Group A:
 7–7 
 6–21 
Group B:
 7–10 
 19–6 
Group C:
 4–15 
 10–9 
Group D:
 12–4 
 5–22

July 16, 2011 (Saturday)

American football
IFAF World Championship in Vienna, Austria:
5th place match:  17–21 
Gold medal match:   7–50  
The United States win the title for the second successive time.

Athletics
European U23 Championships in Ostrava, Czech Republic:
Men's 200m:  Lykourgos-Stefanos Tsakonas  20.56  James Alaka  20.60  Pavel Maslák  20.67
Men's 400m:  Nigel Levine  46.10  Brian Gregan  46.12  Luke Lennon-Ford  46.22
Men's 5000m:  Sindre Buraas  14:22.69  Ross Millington  14:22.78  Jesper van der Wielen  14:23.31
Men's 110m hurdles:  Sergey Shubenkov  13.56  Balázs Baji  13.58  Lawrence Somerset Clarke  13.62
Men's 400m hurdles:  Jack Green  49.13  Nathan Woodward  49.28  Emir Bekric  49.61
Men's pole vault:  Paweł Wojciechowski  5.70m  Karsten Dilla  5.60m  Dmitriy Zhelyabin  5.55m
Men's javelin throw:  Till Wöschler  84.38m  Fatih Avan  84.11m  Dmitry Tarabin  83.18m
Women's 200m:  Darya Pizhankova  23.20  Anna Kielbasinska  23.23  Moa Hjelmer  23.24
Women's 400m:  Olga Topilskaya  51.45  Yuliya Terekhova  52.63  Lena Schmidt  52.66
Women's 100m hurdles:  Alina Talay  12.91  Lisa Urech  13.00  Cindy Roleder  13.10
Women's 400m hurdles:  Hanna Yaroshchuk  54.77  Hanna Titimets  54.91  Meghan Beesley  55.69
Women's 3000m steeplechase:  Gülcan Mıngır  9:47.83  Jana Sussmann  9:48.01  Mariya Shatalova  9:48.22
Women's high jump:  Esthera Petre  1.98m  Oksana Okuneva  1.94m  Burcu Ayhan  1.94m
Women's hammer throw:  Bianca Perie  71.59m  Joanna Fiodorow  70.06m  Sophie Hitchon  69.59m
Women's javelin throw:  Sarah Mayer  59.29m  Vira Rebryk  58.95m  Oona Sormunen  58.54m
Central American and Caribbean Championships in Mayagüez, Puerto Rico:
Men's 5000m:  José Uribe  14:08.10  Luis Orta  14:14.30  Julio Pérez  14:22.01
Men's 3000m steeplechase:  Luis Enrique Ibarra  8:55.86  Fernando Roman  8:58.95  Aaron Arias  9:01.35
Men's 400m hurdles:  Leford Green  49.03  Félix Sánchez  49.41  Jehue Gordon  50.10
Men's pole vault:  Cristian Sanchez  5.00m  Alexander Castillo  4.90m  César González  4.90m
Men's long jump:  Tyrone Smith  8.06m  Damar Forbes  7.81m  Raymond Higgs  7.75m
Men's hammer throw:  Roberto Janet  71.65m  Roberto Sawyer  65.96m  Pedro Muñoz  63.63m
Men's javelin throw:  Guillermo Martínez  81.55m  Arley Ibargüen  75.71m  Jaime Dayron Marquez  74.07m
Men's decathlon:  Marcos Sanchez  7397 points  Claston Bernard  7299  Jonathan Davis  6766
Men's 4 × 100 m relay:   (Lerone Clarke, Dexter Lee, Jason Young, Oshane Bailey) 38.81   (Aaron Armstrong, Darrel Brown, Emmanuel Callander, Keston Bledman) 38.89   (Jason Rogers, Kim Collins, Antoine Adams, Brijesh Lawrence) 39.07
Women's 5000m:  Marisol Romero  16:05.68  Sandra Lopez  16:06.83  Johana Rivero  17:23.01
Women's 400m hurdles:  Andrea Sutherland  56.75  Yolanda Osana  57.23  Katrina Seymour  57.24
Women's high jump:  Levern Spencer  1.82m  Marielys Rojas  1.82m  Fabiola Ayala  1.79m
Women's 4 × 100 m relay:   (Magnolia Howell, Michelle-Lee Ayhe, Ayanna Hutchinson, Semoy Hackett) 43.47   (Jura Levy, Anastasia Le-Roy, Simone Facey, Patricia Hall) 43.63   (V'Alonne Robinson, Nivea Smith, Cache Armbrister, Anthonique Strachan) 43.74

Auto racing
Nationwide Series:
New England 200 in Loudon, New Hampshire: (1)  Kyle Busch (Toyota; Joe Gibbs Racing) (2)  Kevin Harvick (Chevrolet; Kevin Harvick Incorporated) (3)  Kasey Kahne (Chevrolet; JR Motorsports)
Busch wins his 49th race in the secondary class, tying Mark Martin's record. Busch's victory is also his 100th in the NASCAR national series — Sprint Cup, Nationwide Series and Camping World Truck Series — and becomes the third person to reach that mark, after Richard Petty and David Pearson.
Drivers' championship standings (after 19 of 34 races): (1)  Elliott Sadler (Chevrolet; Kevin Harvick Incorporated) 673 points (2)  Reed Sorenson (Chevrolet; Turner Motorsports) 666 (3)  Ricky Stenhouse Jr. (Ford; Roush Fenway Racing) 655

Cycling
Grand Tours:
Tour de France, Stage 14:  Jelle Vanendert  5h 13' 25"  Samuel Sánchez  + 21"  Andy Schleck  + 46"
General classification (after stage 14): (1) Thomas Voeckler   61h 04' 10" (2) Fränk Schleck   + 1' 49" (3) Cadel Evans  + 2' 06"

Diving
World Aquatics Championships in Shanghai, China:
Women's 3 m synchro springboard:  Wu Minxia/He Zi  356.40 points  Émilie Heymans/Jennifer Abel  313.50  Anabelle Smith/Sharleen Stratton  306.90
Wu wins the event for the fifth time. He wins her first synchro springboard title and second world championship title.

Equestrianism
CHIO Aachen in Aachen, Germany:
Dressage – Grand Prix Spécial:  Matthias Alexander Rath  on Totilas  Adelinde Cornelissen  on Parzival  Isabell Werth  on El Santo NRW
Eventing – CICO 3*:
Team result:   (William Fox-Pitt, Mary King, Polly Stockton, Nicola Wilson)   Clarke Johnstone, Caroline Powell, Andrew Nicholson, Jonathan Paget)   (Sara Algotsson-Ostholt, Christoffer Forsberg, Malin Petersen, Katrin Norling)
Individual result:  Michael Jung  on Sam FBW  Stefano Brecciaroli  on Apollo van de Wendi Kurt Hoeve  Fox-Pitt on Neuf des Coeurs
Show jumping – Best of Champions:  Janne Friederike Meyer  on Holiday by Solitour  Rolf-Göran Bengtsson  on Carusso  Denis Lynch  on Lord Luis

Fencing
European Championships in Sheffield, United Kingdom:
Men's sabre individual:  Aleksey Yakimenko   Bolade Apithy   Max Hartung  & Áron Szilágyi 
Women's épée individual:  Tiffany Geroudet   Britta Heidemann   Ana Maria Brânză  & Nathalie Möllhausen

Football (soccer)
FIFA Women's World Cup in Germany:
Third place play-off in Sinsheim:   2–1 
Copa América in Argentina:
Quarterfinals:
 0–2 (a.e.t.)  in Córdoba
 1–1 (4–5 pen.)  in Santa Fe
CAF Champions League Group stage, matchday 1:
Group A: Raja Casablanca  0–0  Coton Sport
Group B: MC Alger  1–1  Espérance ST
CAF Confederation Cup Group stage, matchday 1:
Group A: Kaduna United  1–1  Inter Luanda
Group B:
Sunshine Stars  2–0  Motema Pembe
Maghreb de Fès  1–0  JS Kabylie

Golf
Men's majors:
The Open Championship in Sandwich, Kent, United Kingdom:
Leaderboard after third round: (1) Darren Clarke  205 (−5) (2) Dustin Johnson  206 (−4) (T3) Thomas Bjørn  & Rickie Fowler  208 (−2)

Snooker
World Cup in Bangkok, Thailand:
Quarter-finals:
Wales  4–2 
China  4–1 
England  3–4 
Scotland  3–4

Triathlon
ITU World Championships, Leg 4 in Hamburg, Germany:
Men:  Brad Kahlefeldt  1:44:08  William Clarke  1:44:09  David Hauss  1:44:09
Standings (after 4 of 6 events): (1) Javier Gómez  2027 points (2) Clarke 1935 (3) Hauss 1907

Volleyball
Women's European League Final Four in Istanbul, Turkey:
Bronze medal match:  0–3  
Final:   3–0  
Serbia win the title for the third successive time.
Men's European League Final Four in Košice, Slovakia:
Semifinals:
 2–3 
 3–0

July 15, 2011 (Friday)

American football
IFAF World Championship in Vienna, Austria:
7th place match:  10–48 
Bronze medal match:  14–17

Athletics
European U23 Championships in Ostrava, Czech Republic:
Men's 100m:  James Alaka  10.45  Michael Tumi  10.47  Andrew Robertson  10.52
Men's 800m:  Adam Kszczot  1:46.71  Kevin López  1:46.93  Mukhtar Mohammed  1:48.01
Men's long jump:  Aleksandr Menkov  8.08m  Marcos Chuva  7.94m  Guillaume Victorin  7.86m
Men's decathlon:  Thomas van der Plaetsen  8157 points  Eduard Mikhan  8152  Mihail Dudas  8117
Women's discus throw:  Julia Fischer  59.60m  Nastassia Kashtanava  56.25m  Anita Márton  54.14m
Women's triple jump:  Paraskevi Papahristou  14.40m  Carmen Toma  13.92m  Anna Jagaciak  13.86m
Women's 100m:  Andreea Ograzeanu  11.65  Darya Pizhankova  11.69  Leena Günther  11.75
Women's 800m:  Elena Arzhakova  1:59.41  Merve Aydın  2:00.46  Lynsey Sharp  2:00.65
Women's 10,000m:  Layesh Abdullayeva  32:18.05  Lyudmyla Kovalenko  33:35.36  Catarina Ribeiro  34:10.39
Women's shot put:  Yevgeniya Kolodko  18.87m  Sophie Kleeberg  17.92m  Melissa Boekelman  17.88m
Central American and Caribbean Championships in Mayagüez, Puerto Rico:
Men's 100m:  Keston Bledman  10.05  Daniel Bailey  10.11  Dexter Lee  10.18
Men's 400m:  Renny Quow  45.44  Ramon Miller  45.56  Erison Hurtault  45.93
Men's 1500m:  Nico Herrera  3:44.92  Jose Esparza  3:45.78  Jon Rankin  3:46.09
Men's 10,000m:  Juan Romero  28:54.06  Alejandro Suárez  29:15.49  Milton Ayala  30:55.71
Men's shot put:  O'Dayne Richards  19.16m  Stephen Saenz  18.66m  Edder Moreno  18.52m
Men's discus throw:  Jason Morgan  60.20m  Mario Cota  58.80m  Quincy Wilson  56.85m
Women's 100m:  Semoy Hackett  11.27  Jura Levy  11.36  Simone Facey  11.39
Women's 400m:  Shereefa Lloyd  51.69  Patricia Hall  51.85  Norma Gonzalez  51.90
Women's 1500m:  Sandra Lopez  4:22.65  Korene Hinds  4:23.78  Pilar McShine  4:24.93
Women's triple jump:  Ayanna Alexander  13.50m  Aida Villareal  13.40m  Ana José  13.11m
Women's pole vault:  Keisa Monterola  4.00m  Milena Agudelo  3.95m  Andrea Zambrana  3.80m
Women's discus throw:  Dénia Caballero  62.06m  Brittany Borrero  54.03m  Allison Randall  52.75m
Women's hammer throw:  Johana Moreno  67.97m  Rosa Rodríguez  65.74m  Natalie Grant  62.46m

Cycling
Grand Tours:
Tour de France, Stage 13:  Thor Hushovd  3h 47' 36"  David Moncoutié  + 10"  Jérémy Roy  + 26"
General classification (after stage 13): (1) Thomas Voeckler    55h 49' 57" (2) Fränk Schleck  + 1' 49" (3) Cadel Evans  + 2' 06"

Fencing
European Championships in Sheffield, United Kingdom:
Men's épée individual:  Jörg Fiedler   Bas Verwijlen   Max Heinzer  & Tomasz Motyka 
Women's foil individual:  Elisa Di Francisca   Valentina Vezzali   Edina Knapek  & Yevgeniya Lamonova

Golf
Men's majors:
The Open Championship in Sandwich, Kent, United Kingdom:
Leaderboard after second round: (T1) Darren Clarke  & Lucas Glover  136 (−4) (T3) Thomas Bjørn , Chad Campbell , Martin Kaymer  & Miguel Ángel Jiménez  137 (−3)

Snooker
World Cup in Bangkok, Thailand (teams in bold advance to quarter-finals):
Group A:
Egypt  2–3 
Wales  3–2 
Final standings: Wales 14 points, Republic of Ireland 11, Pakistan 10,  9, Egypt 6.
Group B:
United Arab Emirates  1–4 
Thailand 1  1–4 
Final standings: China, Australia 13 points,  12, Thailand 1 8, United Arab Emirates 4.
Group C:
Brazil  1–4 
England  3–2 
Final standings: England 14 points, Northern Ireland 13 points, India 9,  8, Brazil 6.
Group D:
Thailand 2  4–1 
Scotland  3–2 
Final standings: Scotland 13 points, Hong Kong 11, Thailand 2 10,  9, Poland 7.

Surfing
Women's World Tour:
Roxy Pro in Biarritz, France: (1) Stephanie Gilmore  (2) Carissa Moore  (3) Sally Fitzgibbons  & Pauline Ado 
Standings (after 6 of 7 events): (1) Moore 55,000 points (2) Fitzgibbons 48,150 (3) Gilmore 39,350

Volleyball
Women's European League Final Four in Istanbul, Turkey:
Semifinals:
 3–0 
 3–0

July 14, 2011 (Thursday)

Athletics
European U23 Championships in Ostrava, Czech Republic:
Men's shot put:  David Storl  20.45m  Dmytro Savytskyy  19.18m  Marin Premeru  18.83m
Men's 10,000m:  Sondre Nordstad Moen  28:41.66  Ahmed El Mazoury  28:46.97  Musa Roba-Kinkal  28:57.91

Cycling
Grand Tours:
Tour de France, Stage 12:  Samuel Sánchez  6h 01' 15"  Jelle Vanendert  + 7"  Fränk Schleck  + 10"
General classification (after stage 12): (1) Thomas Voeckler   51h 54' 44" (2) Schleck  + 1' 49" (3) Cadel Evans  + 2' 06"

Equestrianism
CHIO Aachen in Aachen, Germany:
Dressage – Grand Prix de Dressage (CDIO 5*):
Team result (Nations Cup of Germany):   (Anabel Balkenhol, Christoph Koschel, Isabell Werth, Matthias Alexander Rath)   (Richard Davison, Charlotte Dujardin, Emile Faurie, Laura Bechtolsheimer)   (Marlies van Baalen, Hans Peter Minderhoud, Edward Gal, Adelinde Cornelissen)
Individual result:  Rath on Totilas  Bechtolsheimer on Mistral Hojris  Werth on El Santo NRW
Show jumping – FEI Nations Cup:
Nations Cup of Germany (CSIO 5*):   (Eric van der Vleuten, Jur Vrieling, Gerco Schröder, Jeroen Dubbeldam)   (Shane Breen, Shane Sweetnam, Denis Lynch, Billy Twomey),  (Guy Williams, Nick Skelton, Scott Brash, Michael Whitaker) &  (Christian Ahlmann, Janne Friederike Meyer, Carsten-Otto Nagel, Ludger Beerbaum)
Standings (after 5 of 8 events): (1) Netherlands 39.5 points (2) Ireland 30 (3) Germany 27

Fencing
European Championships in Sheffield, United Kingdom:
Women's sabre individual:  Olha Kharlan   Aleksandra Socha   Julia Gavrilova  & Halyna Pundyk 
Men's foil individual (ITA unless stated):  Giorgio Avola  Andrea Cassarà  Andrea Baldini & Alexey Cheremisinov

Football (soccer)
UEFA Europa League Second qualifying round, first leg:
Shakhter Karagandy  2–1  St Patrick's Athletic
Metalurgist Rustavi  1–1  Irtysh Pavlodar
Śląsk Wrocław  1–0  Dundee United
Rad  0–1  Olympiakos Volou
KuPS  1–0  Gaz Metan Mediaș
Flamurtari Vlorë  0–2  Jablonec
Iskra-Stal  1–1  Varaždin
Tauras Tauragė  2–3  ADO Den Haag
Rudar Pljevlja  0–3  Austria Wien
TPS  0–1  Westerlo
Sant Julià  0–2  Bnei Yehuda
Minsk  1–1  Gaziantepspor
Örebro  0–0  Sarajevo
Shakhtyor Soligorsk  0–1  Ventspils
Vålerenga  1–0  Mika
Ferencváros  2–1  Aalesund
Häcken  1–0  Honka
Anorthosis  3–0  Gagra
Floriana  0–8  AEK Larnaca
Maccabi Tel Aviv  3–1  Khazar Lankaran
Llanelli  2–1  Dinamo Tbilisi
Sūduva Marijampolė  1–1  Elfsborg
Olimpija Ljubljana  2–0  Bohemians
Differdange 03  0–0  Levadia Tallinn
Tirana  0–0  Spartak Trnava
The New Saints  1–3  Midtjylland
Vaduz  0–2  Vojvodina
EB/Streymur  1–1  Qarabağ
Paks  1–1  Tromsø
Kecskemét  1–1  Aktobe
Željezničar  1–0  Sheriff Tiraspol
Juvenes/Dogana  0–1  Rabotnički
Liepājas Metalurgs  1–4  Red Bull Salzburg
Vllaznia Shkodër  0–0  Thun
Metalurg Skopje  0–0  Lokomotiv Sofia
Glentoran  0–2  Vorskla Poltava
Crusaders  1–3  Fulham
Domžale  1–2  Split
KR Reykjavík  3–0  Žilina
FH  1–1  Nacional

Golf
Men's majors:
The Open Championship in Sandwich, Kent, United Kingdom:
Leaderboard after first round: (T1) Thomas Bjørn  & Tom Lewis  (a) 65 (−5) (T3) Lucas Glover , Miguel Ángel Jiménez  & Webb Simpson  66 (−4)
Lewis records the lowest score by an amateur at the Open, and becomes the first amateur to hold the lead of the Open since Michael Bonallack  in 1968. He is also the first amateur to lead any major since Mike Reid  led after the first round of the 1976 U.S. Open.

Snooker
World Cup in Bangkok, Thailand (teams in bold advance to quarter-finals):
Group A:
Wales  3–2 
Germany  2–3 
Standings: Wales 11 points (3 matches), Republic of Ireland 9 (3), Germany 9 (4), Pakistan 7 (3),  4 (3).
Group B:
United Arab Emirates  0–5 
China  3–2 
Standings: Malta 12 points (4 matches), China, Australia 9 (3),  7 (3), United Arab Emirates 3 (3).
Group C:
Belgium  2–3 
England  4–1 
Standings: England, Northern Ireland 11 points (3 matches), Belgium 8 (4), India 5 (3).
Group D:
Poland  1–4 
Scotland  3–2 
Standings: Scotland 10 points (3 matches),  9 (3), Afghanistan 9 (4), Poland, Thailand 2 6 (3).

July 13, 2011 (Wednesday)

American football
IFAF World Championship in Austria (team in bold advances to final):
Group 2 in Graz:
 27–31 
 16–24 
Final standings: Canada 3–0, Japan 2–1, France 1–2, Austria 0–3.

Cricket
Tri-nation series in Scotland in Edinburgh:  284/7 (50 overs);  101 (32.4 overs; Lasith Malinga 5/30). Sri Lanka win by 183 runs.
Final standings: Sri Lanka 7 points, Scotland 4,  2.

Cycling
Grand Tours:
Tour de France, Stage 11:  Mark Cavendish  3h 46' 07"  André Greipel  s.t.  Tyler Farrar  s.t.
General classification (after stage 11): (1) Thomas Voeckler   45h 52' 39" (2) Luis León Sánchez  + 1' 49" (3) Cadel Evans  + 2' 26"

Equestrianism
CHIO Aachen in Aachen, Germany:
Show jumping – Prize of Europe (CSIO 5*):  Meredith Michaels-Beerbaum  on Shutterfly  Ludger Beerbaum  on Chaman  Laura Kraut  on Teirra

Football (soccer)
FIFA Women's World Cup in Germany:
Semifinals:
 1–3  in Mönchengladbach
The United States reach the final for a record-equalling third time.
 3–1  in Frankfurt
Japan reach the final for the first time.
Copa América in Argentina (teams in bold advance to quarterfinals):
Group B:
 3–3  in Salta
 4–2  in Córdoba
Final standings: Brazil, Venezuela 5 points, Paraguay 3, Ecuador 1.
UEFA Champions League Second qualifying round, first leg:
Zestafoni  3–0  Dacia Chişinău
Maccabi Haifa  5–1  Borac Banja Luka
Malmö FF  2–0  HB Tórshavn
Bangor City  0–3  HJK Helsinki
Skënderbeu Korçë  0–2  APOEL
Dinamo Zagreb  3–0  Neftchi Baku
Sturm Graz  2–0  Videoton
Skonto  0–1  Wisła Kraków
Partizan  4–0  Škendija
Rosenborg  5–0  Breiðablik
Linfield  1–1  BATE Borisov

Rugby union
IRB Pacific Nations Cup, round 3 in Lautoka, Fiji:
 29–19 
 24–13 
Final standings: Japan, Tonga 10 points, Fiji, Samoa 5.
Japan win the title for the first time.

Snooker
World Cup in Bangkok, Thailand:
Group A:
Egypt  1–4 
Wales  3–2 
Standings: Wales 8 points (2 matches), Germany 7 (3), Republic of Ireland 6 (2),  5 (2), Egypt 4 (3).
Group B:
Thailand 1  2–3 
China  3–2 
Standings:  7 points (2 matches), Malta, Thailand 1 7 (3), China 6 (2), United Arab Emirates 3 (2).
Group C:
Brazil  1–4 
England  3–2 
Standings: Northern Ireland 8 points (2 matches), England 7 (2), Belgium 6 (3), Brazil 5 (3),  4 (2).
Group D:
Scotland  4–1 
Thailand 2  1–4 
Standings: Hong Kong 9 points (3 matches), Scotland 7 (2), Afghanistan 5 (3), Thailand 2 4 (2).

July 12, 2011 (Tuesday)

American football
IFAF World Championship in Austria (team in bold advances to final):
Group 1 in Innsbruck:
 30–20 
 7–17 
Final standings: United States 3–0, Mexico 2–1, Germany 1–2, Australia 0–3.

Baseball
Major League Baseball All-Star Game in Phoenix: National League 5, American League 1.
The National League win back-to-back All-Star Games for the first time since winning three in succession between 1994 and 1996. Milwaukee Brewers first baseman Prince Fielder is named as Most Valuable Player, after a three-run go-ahead home run in the fourth inning.

Cricket
Tri-nation series in Scotland in Edinburgh:  320/8 (50 overs; Paul Stirling 113);  323/5 (48.3 overs). Scotland win by 5 wickets.
Standings: Scotland 4 points (1 match), Ireland 2 (2),  2 (1).

Cycling
Grand Tours:
Tour de France, Stage 10:  André Greipel  3h 31' 21"  Mark Cavendish  s.t.  José Joaquín Rojas  s.t.
General classification (after stage 10): (1) Thomas Voeckler   42h 06' 32" (2) Luis León Sánchez  + 1' 49" (3) Cadel Evans  + 2' 26"

Football (soccer)
2014 FIFA World Cup qualification (CONCACAF) First round, second leg (first leg scores in parentheses):
 4–2 (2–4) . 6–6 on aggregate; Saint Lucia win 5–4 on penalties.
Copa América in Argentina:
Group C (teams in bold advance to quarterfinals):
 1–0  in Mendoza
 1–0  in La Plata
Final standings: Chile 7 points, Uruguay 5, Peru 4, Mexico 0.
UEFA Champions League Second qualifying round, first leg:
Pyunik  0–4  Viktoria Plzeň
Valletta  2–3  Ekranas
Mogren  1–2  Litex Lovech
Maribor  2–0  F91 Dudelange
Slovan Bratislava  2–0  Tobol Kostanay
Shamrock Rovers  1–0  Flora Tallinn

Snooker
World Cup in Bangkok, Thailand:
Group A:
Pakistan  2–3 
Wales  5–0 
Standings: Wales 5 points (1 match), Germany, Pakistan 5 (2), Egypt 3 (2),  2 (1).
Group B:
Malta  2–3 
Thailand 1  4–1 
Standings: Australia 7 points (2 matches), Thailand 1 5 (2), Malta 4 (2),  3 (1), United Arab Emirates 1 (1).
Group C:
India  3–2 
England  4–1 
Standings: England,  4 points (1 match), India, Brazil, Belgium 4 (2).
Group D:
Scotland  3–2 
Afghanistan  2–3 
Standings: Poland, Hong Kong 5 points (2 matches), Afghanistan 4 (2), Scotland,  3 (1).

July 11, 2011 (Monday)

American football
IFAF World Championship in Austria:
Group 2 in Graz:
 10–35 
 14–36 
Standings: Japan, Canada 2–0, Austria, France 0–2.

Baseball
Major League Baseball Home Run Derby in Phoenix: New York Yankees second baseman Robinson Canó defeats Boston Red Sox first baseman Adrián González in the finals, 12–11, to win the event.

Cricket
Tri-nation series in Scotland in Edinburgh:  vs. . Match abandoned without a ball bowled.

Football (soccer)
Copa América in Argentina (team in bold advances to quarterfinals):
Group A in Córdoba:  3–0 
Final standings:  7 points, Argentina 5, Costa Rica 3,  1.

Golf
Women's majors:
U.S. Women's Open in Colorado Springs, Colorado:
Leaderboard after final round: (T1) Hee Kyung Seo  & So Yeon Ryu  281 (−3) (3) Cristie Kerr  283 (−1)
3 holes playoff: Ryu 10 (−2) def. Seo 13 (+1)
Ryu wins her first major title.

Snooker
World Cup in Bangkok, Thailand:
Group A:
Pakistan  3–2 
Egypt  3–2 
Group B:
Thailand 1  1–4 
China  3–2 
Group C:
Brazil  3–2 
India  1–4 
Group D:
Thailand 2  3–2 
Hong Kong  2–3

July 10, 2011 (Sunday)

American football
IFAF World Championship in Austria:
Group 1 in Innsbruck:
 0–65 
 48–7 
Standings: United States, Mexico 2–0, Germany, Australia 0–2.

Archery
World Championships in Turin, Italy:
Men's individual recurve:  Kim Woojin   Oh Jin-Hyek   Brady Ellison 
Women's individual recurve:  Denissé van Lamoen   Kristine Esebua   Fang Yuting 
Men's team recurve:   (Oh, Kim, Im Dong-Hyun)   (Gaël Prévost, Jean-Charles Valladont, Romain Girouille)   (Michele Frangilli, Marco Galiazzo, Mauro Nespoli)
Women's team recurve:   (Natalia Valeeva, Guendalina Sartori, Jessica Tomasi)   (Deepika Kumari, Bombayala Devi, Chekrovolu Swuro)   (Han Gyeonghee, Jung Dasomi, Ki Bo-Bee)
Mixed team recurve:   (Im, Ki Bo-Bae)   (Juan René Serrano, Aída Román)   (Laurence Godfrey, Amy Oliver)

Athletics
Samsung Diamond League:
Aviva Birmingham Grand Prix in Birmingham, United Kingdom:
Men:
100m: Asafa Powell  9.91
400m hurdles: Dai Greene  48.20
800m: Abubaker Kaki Khamis  1:44.54
5000m: Mo Farah  13:06.14
Triple jump: Phillips Idowu  17.54m
Shot put: Dylan Armstrong  21.55m
Javelin throw: Andreas Thorkildsen  88.30m
Women:
100m hurdles: Sally Pearson  12.48
200m: Bianca Knight  22.59
400m: Amantle Montsho  50.20
800m: Jenny Meadows  2:02.06
1500m: Morgan Uceny  4:05.64
3000m steeplechase: Sofia Assefa  9:25.87
Long jump: Janay DeLoach  6.78m
High jump: Blanka Vlašić  1.99m
Pole vault: Silke Spiegelburg  4.66m
Discus throw: Nadine Müller  65.75m
World Youth Championships in Lille Métropole, France:
Boys' 200m:  Stephen Newbold  20.89  Odail Todd  21.00  Ronald Darby  21.08
Boys' 1500m:  Teshome Dirirsa  3:39.13  Vincent Mutai  3:39.17  Jonathan Kiplimo  3:39.54
Boys' 3000m:  William Malel Sitonik  7:40.10  Patrick Mutunga Mwikya  7:40.47  Abrar Osman Adem  7:40.89
Boys' medley relay:   (Darby, Aldrich Bailey, Najee Glass, Arman Hall) 1:49.47   (Kazuma Oseto, Akiyuki Hashimoto, Shotaro Aikyo, Takuya Fukunaga) 1:50.69   (Wilhem Belocian, Mickaël Zézé, Jordan Geenen, Thomas Jordier) 1:51.81
Boys' javelin throw:  Reinhard van Zyl  82.96m  Morné Moolman  80.99m  Guisheng Zhang  77.62m
Boys' pole vault:  Robert Renner  5.25m  Melker Svärd Jacobsson  5.15m  Jacob Blankenship  5.05m
Girls' 200m:  Desirèe Henry  23.25  Christian Brennan  23.47  Shericka Jackson  23.62
Girls' 800m:  Ajee' Wilson  2:02.64  Chunyu Wang  2:03.23  Jessica Judd  2:03.43
Girls' 2000m steeplechase:  Norah Jeruto Tanui  6:16.41  Fadwa Sidi Madane  6:20.98  Lilian Jepkorir Chemweno  6:21.85
Girls' medley relay:   (Christania Williams, Jackson, Chrisann Gordon, Olivia James) 2:03.42   (Jennifer Madu, Bealoved Brown, Kendall Baisden, Robin Reynolds) 2:03.92   (Shamelle Pless, Khamica Bingham, Brennan, Sage Watson) 2:05.72
Girls' long jump:  Chanice Porter  6.22m  Anastassia Angioi  6.17m  Marina Buchelnikova  6.11m
Asian Championships in Kobe, Japan:
Men's 110m hurdles:  Liu Xiang  13.22  Shi Dongpeng  13.56  Park Tae-Kyong  13.66
Men's 200m:  Femi Seun Ogunode  20.41  Hitoshi Saito  20.75  Omar Jouma Al-Salfa  20.97
Men's 4 × 100 m relay:   (Sota Kawatsura, Masashi Eriguchi, Shinji Takahira, Saito) 39.18   (Tang Yik Chun, Lai Chun Ho, Ng Ka Fung, Chi Ho Tsui) 39.26   (Wang Wen-Tang, Liu Yuan-Kai, Tsai Meng-Lin, Yi Wei-Che) 39.30
Men's 800m:  Mohammad Al-Azemi  1:46.14  Sajjad Moradi  1:46.35  Ghamnda Ram  1:46.46
Men's 4 × 400 m relay:   (Yusuke Ishitsuka, Kei Takase, Hideyuki Hirose, Yuzo Kanemaru) 3:04.72   (Mohammed Ali Albishi, Hamed Al-Bishi, Y. I. Alhezam, Yousef Ahmed Masrahi) 3:08.03   (Peyman Rajabi, A. Ghelichizokhanou, Ehsan Mohajer Shojaei, Sajjad Hashemiahangari) 3:08.58
Men's long jump:  Su Xiongfeng  8.19m  Supanara Sukhasvasti  8.05m  Rikiya Saruyama  8.05m
Men's javelin throw:  Yukifumi Murakami  83.27m  Park Jae-Myong  80.19m  Ivan Zaitcev  79.22m
Women's 100m hurdles:  Sun Yawei  13.04  Jung Hye-Lim  13.11  Natalya Ivoninskaya  13.15
Women's 200m:  Chisato Fukushima  23.49  Gretta Taslakian  24.01  Saori Imai  24.06
Women's 4 × 100 m relay:   (Nao Okabe, Momoko Takahashi, Fukushima, Saori Imai) 44.05   (Tao Yujia, Liang Qiuping, Jiang Lan, Wei Yongli) 44.23   (Phatsorn Jaksuninkorn, Orranut Klomdee, Laphassaporn Tawoncharoen, Nongnuch Sanrat) 44.62
Women's 800m:  Truong Thanh Hang  2:01.41  Margarita Matsko  2:02.46  Tintu Luka  2:02.55
Women's 4 × 400 m relay:   (Sayaka Aoki, Chisato Tanaka, Satomi Kubokura, Miho Shingu) 3:35.00   (Tatyana Roslanova, Matsko, Alexandra Kuzina, Olga Tereshkova) 3:36.61   (Alaa Al-Qaysi, Inam Al Sudani, Gulustan Ieso, Danah Abdulrazzaq) 3:41.91
Women's 3000m steeplechase:  Minori Hayakari  9:52.42  Sudha Singh  10:08.52  Thi Phuong Nguyen  10:14.94
Women's high jump:  Zheng Xingjuan  1.92m  Svetlana Radzivil  1.92m  Marina Aitova  1.89m
Women's shot put:  Meng Qianqian  18.31m  Liu Xiangrong  18.30m  Leila Rajabi  16.60m

Auto racing
Formula One:
 in Silverstone, Great Britain: (1) Fernando Alonso  (Ferrari) (2) Sebastian Vettel  (Red Bull–Renault) (3) Mark Webber  (Red Bull-Renault)
Drivers' championship standings (after 9 of 19 races): (1) Vettel 204 points (2) Webber 124 (3) Alonso 112
IndyCar Series:
Honda Indy Toronto in Toronto: (1) Dario Franchitti  (Chip Ganassi Racing) (2) Scott Dixon  (Chip Ganassi Racing) (3) Ryan Hunter-Reay  (Andretti Autosport)
Drivers' championship standings (after 10 of 18 races): (1) Franchitti 353 points (2) Will Power  (Team Penske) 298 (3) Dixon 270
V8 Supercars:
Sucrogen Townsville 400 in Townsville, Queensland:
Race 15: (1) Jamie Whincup  (Triple Eight Race Engineering; Holden VE Commodore) (2) Craig Lowndes  (Triple Eight Race Engineering; Holden VE Commodore) (3) Mark Winterbottom  (Ford Performance Racing; Ford FG Falcon)
Drivers' championship standings (after 15 of 28 races): (1) Whincup 1683 points (2) Lowndes 1497 (3) Shane van Gisbergen  (Stone Brothers Racing; Ford FG Falcon) 1317

Baseball
All-Star Futures Game in Phoenix: U.S. Futures 6, World Futures 4.
U.S. win the game for the second successive year and the seventh time overall. Oakland Athletics shortstop Grant Green is named game MVP.

Basketball
FIBA Under-19 World Championship in Riga, Latvia:
Bronze medal game:  72–77  
Final:   67–85  
Lithuania win the title for the first time.

Cricket
India in the West Indies:
3rd Test in Roseau, Dominica; day 5:  204 & 322 (131.3 overs; Shivnarine Chanderpaul 116*);  347 & 94/3 (32 overs). Match drawn; India win 3-match series 1–0.

Cycling
Grand Tours:
Tour de France, Stage 9:  Luis León Sánchez  5h 27' 09"  Thomas Voeckler  + 5"  Sandy Casar  + 13"
General classification (after stage 9): (1) Voeckler  38h 35' 11" (2) Sánchez + 1' 49" (3) Cadel Evans  + 2' 26"

Equestrianism
Falsterbo Horse Show in Skanör med Falsterbo, Sweden:
Show jumping – Grand Prix (CSIO 5*):  Patrice Delaveau  on Orient Express  Angelica Augustsson  on Mic Mac du Tillard  Maikel van der Vleuten  on Verdi
CHIO Aachen in Aachen, Germany:
Show jumping – Olympic Qualification for Central and Eastern Europe, Asia and Oceania (CSI 2*):
Best team:  (Cassio Rivetti, Björn Nagel, Oleg Krasyuk, Katharina Offel)
Best South East Asia or Oceania competitor: Taizo Sugitani 
Vaulting – Nations Cup of Germany (combined competition):   I (Pia Engelberty, Jannik Heiland, RSV Neuss Grimlinghausen)  Germany II

Football (soccer)
FIFA Women's World Cup in Germany:
Quarterfinals:
 3–1  in Augsburg
Sweden qualify for the 2012 Olympic Tournament.
 2–2 (3–5 pen.)  in Dresden
The United States advance to the semifinals for the sixth successive time.
2014 FIFA World Cup qualification (CONCACAF) First round, second leg (first leg score in parentheses):
 1–2 (0–2) . U.S. Virgin Islands win 4–1 on aggregate.
 4–0 (2–0) . Dominican Republic win 6–0 on aggregate.
FIFA U-17 World Cup in Mexico City, Mexico:
Third-place match:  3–4  
Final:   0–2  
Mexico win the title for the second time.
Copa América in Argentina (team in bold advances to quarterfinals):
Group A in Santa Fe:  2–0 
Standings: Colombia 7 points (3 matches),  3 (2),  2 (2), Bolivia 1 (3).
International friendly:
 1–3  Tusker
South Sudan plays its first football fixture during its independence celebration.

Golf
Women's majors:
U.S. Women's Open in Colorado Springs, Colorado:
Leaderboard after third round (USA unless indicated): (T1) Cristie Kerr, So Yeon Ryu  & Angela Stanford 212 (−1)
Leaderboard after fourth day: (1) Hee Kyung Seo  281 (−3) (2) Ryu −2 after 69 holes (3) Kerr −1 after 70 holes
30 players will complete their rounds tomorrow.
PGA Tour:
John Deere Classic in Silvis, Illinois:
Winner: Steve Stricker  262 (−22)
Stricker wins the tournament for the third consecutive year, for his eleventh PGA Tour title.
European Tour:
Barclays Scottish Open in Inverness, Scotland:
Winner: Luke Donald  197 (−19)
Donald wins his third European Tour title of the season and sixth of his career.
Champions Tour:
Nature Valley First Tee Open at Pebble Beach in Pebble Beach, California:
Winner: Jeff Sluman  206 (−10)
Sluman wins the tournament for the third time in four years, for his fourth Champions Tour title.

Motorcycle racing
Superbike:
Brno World Championship round in Brno, Czech Republic:
Race 1: (1) Marco Melandri  (Yamaha YZF-R1) (2) Max Biaggi  (Aprilia RSV4) (3) Carlos Checa  (Ducati 1098R)
Race 2: (1) Biaggi (2) Melandri (3) Checa
Riders' championship standings (after 8 of 13 rounds): (1) Checa 293 points (2) Biaggi 263 (3) Melandri 240
Supersport:
Brno World Championship round in Brno, Czech Republic: (1) Gino Rea  (Honda CBR600RR) (2) Fabien Foret  (Honda CBR600RR) (3) Chaz Davies  (Yamaha YZF-R6)
Riders' championship standings (after 7 of 12 rounds): (1) Davies 121 points (2) Broc Parkes  (Kawasaki Ninja ZX-6R) & Foret 85

Netball
World Championships in Singapore:
Bronze medal match:   70–49 
Gold medal match:   57–58  
Australia win the title for the second successive time and tenth time overall.

Snooker
Wuxi Classic in Wuxi, China:
Final: Ali Carter  7–9 Mark Selby 
Selby wins his fifth professional title.

Tennis
Davis Cup World Group Quarterfinals:
 1–4 
Janko Tipsarević  def. Michael Ryderstedt  6–2, 7–5, 6–3
Viktor Troicki  def. Robert Lindstedt  3–6, 6–4 retired
 1–3 
David Ferrer  def. Mardy Fish  7–5, 7–6(3), 5–7, 7–6(5)
 1–4 
Philipp Petzschner  def. Michaël Llodra  6–3, 6–4
Jo-Wilfried Tsonga  def. Philipp Kohlschreiber  7–6(3), 7–6(5)
ATP World Tour:
Campbell's Hall of Fame Tennis Championships in Newport, United States:
Final: John Isner  def. Olivier Rochus  6–3, 7–6(6)
Isner wins his second career title.
WTA Tour:
Poli-Farbe Grand Prix in Budapest, Hungary:
Final: Roberta Vinci  def. Irina-Camelia Begu  6–4, 1–6, 6–4
Vinci wins her third title of the year and sixth of her career.

Volleyball
FIVB World League Final four in Gdańsk and Sopot, Poland:
Bronze medal match:  0–3  
Final:   2–3  
Russia win the title for the second time.
Men's European League, Leg 6 (teams in bold advance to final four):
Pool A:
 0–3 
 3–2 
Final standings: Slovenia 26 points, Belgium 18, Croatia 16, Great Britain 12.
Pool B:
 0–3 
 0–3 
Final standings: Spain 30 points, Netherlands 24, Greece 11, Austria 7.
Pool C:  3–2 
Final standings:  24 points, Slovakia 23,  17, Turkey 8.
Women's European League, Leg 6 (teams in bold advance to final four):
Pool A:  0–3 
Final standings: Serbia 35 points,  21,  14, Greece 2.

July 9, 2011 (Saturday)

American football
IFAF World Championship in Austria:
Group 2 in Graz:
 24–6 
 45–10

Archery
World Championships in Turin, Italy:
Men's individual compound:  Christopher Perkins   Jesse Broadwater   Reo Wilde 
Women's individual compound:  Albina Loginova   Pascale Lebecque   Erika Anschutz 
Men's team compound:    (Broadwater, Braden Gellenthien, Wilde)   (Martin Damsbo, Torben Johannessen, Patrick Laursen)   (Perkins, Simon Rousseau, Dietmar Trillus)
Women's team compound:   (Anschutz, Christie Colin, Jamie Van Natta),   (Vida Halimian, Mahtab Parsamehr, Shabnam Sarlak)   (Olga Bosh, Luzmary Guédez, Ana Mendoza)
Mixed team compound:   (Sergio Pagni, Marcella Tonioli)   (Peter Elzinga, Inge van Caspel)   (Choi Yong-Hee, Seok Ji-Hyun)

Athletics
World Youth Championships in Lille Métropole, France:
Boys' 400m hurdles:  Egor Kuznetsov  50.97  Ibrahim Mohammed Saleh  51.14  Takahiro Matsumoto  51.26
Boys' 800m:  Leonard Kirwa Kosencha  1:44.08  Mohammed Aman  1:44.68  Timothy Kitum  1:44.98
Boys' 10,000m walk:  Pavel Parshin  40:51.31  Kenny Martín Pérez  40:59.25  Erwin González  41:09.60
Boys' triple jump:  Latario Collie-Minns  16.06m  Albert Janki  15.95m  Lathone Collie-Minns  15.51m
Boys' high jump:  Gaël Levécque  2.13m  Usman Usmanov  2.13m  Justin Fondren  2.13m
Girls' 400m hurdles:  Nnenya Hailey  57.93  Sarah Carli  58.05  Surian Hechavarría  58.37
Girls' 1500m:  Faith Chepngetich Kipyegon  4:09.48  Senbere Teferi  4:10.54  Genet Tibieso  4:11.56
Girls' pole vault:  Desiree Singh  4.25m  Liz Parnov  4.20m  Lucy Bryan  4.10m
Girls' discus throw:  Rosalía Vázquez  53.51m  Yan Liang  52.89m  Shelbi Vaughan  52.58m
Girls' hammer throw:  Louisa James  57.13m  Malwina Kopron  57.03m  Roxana Perie  56.75m
Girls' heptathlon:  Yusleidys Mendieta  5697 points  Yorgelis Rodríguez  5671  Marjolein Lindemans  5532
Asian Championships in Kobe, Japan:
Men's 400m hurdles:  Takatoshi Abe  49.64  Yuta Imazeki  50.22  Chieh Chen  50.39
Men's 5000m:  Dejenee Mootumaa  13:40.78  Yuki Sato  13:41.93  Alemu Bekele Gebre  13:48.81
Men's high jump:  Mutaz Essa Barshim  2.35m  Majd Eddin Ghazal  2.28m  Wang Chen  2.26m
Men's shot put:  Chang Ming-Huang  20.14m  Zhang Jun  19.77m  Om Prakash Karhana  19.47m
Women's 400m hurdles:  Satomi Kubokura  56.52  Qi Yang  56.69  Christine Merrill  57.30
Women's 5000m:  Tejitu Daba Chalchissa  15:22.48  Hitomi Niiya  15:34.19   Yuriko Kobayashi  15:42.59
Women's pole vault:  Wu Sha  4.35m  Li Ling  4.30m  Choi Yun-hee  4.00m
Women's triple jump:  Xie Limei  14.58m  Valeriya Kanatova  14.14m  Mayookha Johny  14.11m
Women's heptathlon:  Wassana Winatho  5710 points  Humie Takehara  5491  Chie Kiriyama  5442

Auto racing
Sprint Cup Series:
Quaker State 400 in Sparta, Kentucky: (1)  Kyle Busch (Toyota; Joe Gibbs Racing) (2)  David Reutimann (Toyota; Michael Waltrip Racing) (3)  Jimmie Johnson (Chevrolet; Hendrick Motorsports)
Drivers' championship standings (after 18 of 36 races): (1) Busch 624 points (2)  Carl Edwards (Ford; Roush Fenway Racing) 620 (3)  Kevin Harvick (Chevrolet; Richard Childress Racing) 614
V8 Supercars:
Sucrogen Townsville 400 in Townsville, Queensland:
Race 14: (1) Garth Tander  (Holden Racing Team; Holden VE Commodore) (2) Jamie Whincup  (Triple Eight Race Engineering; Holden VE Commodore) (3) Will Davison  (Ford Performance Racing; Ford FG Falcon)
Drivers' championship standings (after 14 of 28 races): (1) Whincup 1533 points (2) Craig Lowndes  (Triple Eight Race Engineering; Holden VE Commodore) 1359 (3) Shane van Gisbergen  (Stone Brothers Racing; Ford FG Falcon) 1206

Baseball
Derek Jeter becomes the 28th player in Major League Baseball history with 3,000 career hits, and the first to reach the mark with the New York Yankees. He entered the club with a home run off David Price in the third inning of the Yankees' game against the Tampa Bay Rays.

Beach handball
European Championship in Umag, Croatia:
Men's:
3rd place game: Ukraine  1–2   Spain
Final:  Croatia  2–0   Russia
Croatia win the title for the second successive time.
Women's:
3rd place game:  Italy  2–1  Norway
Final:  Denmark  1–2   Croatia
Croatia win the title for the second time.

Cricket
India in the West Indies:
3rd Test in Roseau, Dominica; day 4:  204 & 224/6 (83 overs; Kirk Edwards 110);  347 (108.2 overs; Fidel Edwards 5/103). West Indies lead by 81 runs with 4 wickets remaining.
Sri Lanka in England:
5th ODI in Manchester:  268/9 (50 overs; Suraj Randiv 5/42);  252 (48.2 overs). England win by 16 runs; win 5-match series 3–2.

Cycling
Grand Tours:
Tour de France, Stage 8:  Rui Costa  4h 36' 46"  Philippe Gilbert  + 12"  Cadel Evans  + 15"
General classification (after stage 8): (1) Thor Hushovd   33h 06' 28" (2) Evans + 1" (3) Fränk Schleck  + 4"

Equestrianism
Falsterbo Horse Show in Skanör med Falsterbo, Sweden:
Dressage – World Dressage Masters (CDI 5*):
Grand Prix Freestyle (A-Final):  Patrik Kittel  on Scandic  Anky van Grunsven  on Salinero  Tinne Vilhelmson-Silfven  on Don Auriello
Grand Prix Spécial (B-Final):  Michal Rapcewicz  on Randon  Jenny Schreven  on Krawall  Siril Helljesen  on Dorina
Show jumping – Falsterbo Derby (CSIO 5*):  Patrice Delaveau  on Ornella Mail  Shane Breen  on Gold Rain  Erika Lickhammer  on Hip Hop

Football (soccer)
FIFA Women's World Cup in Germany:
Quarterfinals:
 1–1 (3–4 pen.)  in Leverkusen
France qualify for the 2012 Olympic Tournament.
 0–1 (a.e.t.)  in Wolfsburg
Two times defending champion Germany suffer their first defeat after 15 World Cup matches.
2014 FIFA World Cup qualification (CONCACAF) First round, second leg (first leg score in parentheses):
 6–0 (4–0) . Bahamas win 10–0 on aggregate.
Copa América in Argentina:
Group B:
 2–2  in Córdoba
 1–0  in Salta
Standings (after 2 matches): Venezuela 4 points, Brazil, Paraguay 2, Ecuador 1.

Golf
Women's majors:
U.S. Women's Open in Colorado Springs, Colorado:
Leaderboard after second round and after third day: (1) Mika Miyazato  137 (−5) (2) Ai Miyazato  138 (−4) (3) I.K. Kim  139 (−3)
With only 19 of the 72 players who made the cut having begun their third round, the USGA will attempt to complete the tournament with two rounds on Sunday.

Rugby union
Super Rugby Final in Brisbane: Reds  18–13  Crusaders
The Reds win their first championship in the competition's professional era, and for the third time including their 1994 and 1995 titles in the amateur Super 10.
IRB Pacific Nations Cup, round 2 in Suva, Fiji:
 28–27 
 36–18 
Standings (after 2 games): Tonga 6 points, Samoa, Fiji, Japan 5.

Snooker
Wuxi Classic in Wuxi, China, semi-finals:
Shaun Murphy  3–6 Ali Carter 
Ding Junhui  5–6 Mark Selby

Tennis
Davis Cup World Group Quarterfinals:
 1–2 
Simon Aspelin/Robert Lindstedt  def. Novak Djokovic/Nenad Zimonjić  6–4, 7–6(5), 7–5
 5–0 
Juan Ignacio Chela  def. Evgeny Korolev  2–6, 6–2, 6–0
Juan Mónaco  def. Mikhail Kukushkin  6–4, 6–1
 1–2 
Bob Bryan/Mike Bryan  def. Marcel Granollers/Fernando Verdasco  6–7(3), 6–4, 6–4, 6–4
 0–3 
Michaël Llodra/Jo-Wilfried Tsonga  def. Christopher Kas/Philipp Petzschner  7–6(4), 6–4, 6–4
WTA Tour:
Swedish Open in Båstad, Sweden:
Final: Polona Hercog  def. Johanna Larsson  6–4, 7–5
Hercog wins her first career title.

Volleyball
FIVB World League Final four in Gdańsk and Sopot, Poland:
Semifinals:
 0–3 
 3–1 
Men's European League, Leg 6 (teams in bold advance to final four):
Pool A:
 3–1 
 3–0 
Standings (after 11 matches): Slovenia 26 points, Belgium 15, Croatia 14, Great Britain 11.
Pool B:
 3–2 
 3–0 
Standings (after 11 matches): Spain 27 points, Netherlands 24, Greece 11, Austria 4.
Pool C:
 0–3 
 3–0 
Standings: Romania 24 points (12 matches), Slovakia 21 (11), Belarus 17 (12), Turkey 7 (11).
Women's European League, Leg 6 (teams in bold advance to final four):
Pool A:
 0–3  
 3–0 
Standings: Serbia 32 points (11 matches), France 21 (12), Spain 14 (12), Greece 2 (11).
Pool B:
 3–1 
 3–2 
Final standings: Bulgaria 29, Czech Republic 27, Hungary 10, Israel 6.
Pool C:
 3–0 
 3–1 
Final standings: Turkey 30 points, Romania 22, Belarus 16, Croatia 4.
Women's Pan-American Cup in Ciudad Juárez, Mexico:
Seventh place match:  0–3 
Fifth place match:  2–3 
Bronze medal match:  0–3  
Final:   3–0  
Brazil win the Cup for the third time.

July 8, 2011 (Friday)

American football
IFAF World Championship in Austria:
Group 1 in Innsbruck:
 0–61 
 22–15

Athletics
Samsung Diamond League:
Meeting Areva in Saint-Denis, France:
Men:
200m: Usain Bolt  20.03
400m: Chris Brown  44.94
1500m: Amine Laâlou  3:32.15
110m hurdles: Dayron Robles  13.09
3000m steeplechase: Mahiedine Mekhissi-Benabbad  8:02.09
Discus throw: Robert Harting  67.32m
High jump: Jaroslav Bába  & Aleksey Dmitrik  2.32m
Long jump: Irving Saladino  8.40m
Pole vault: Renaud Lavillenie  5.73m
Women:
100m: Kelly-Ann Baptiste  10.91
800m: Caster Semenya  2:00.18
5000m: Meseret Defar  14:29.52
400m hurdles: Zuzana Hejnová  53.29
Javelin throw: Christina Obergföll  68.01m
Shot put: Valerie Adams  20.78m
Triple jump: Yargelis Savigne  14.99m
World Youth Championships in Lille Métropole, France:
Boys' 2000m steeplechase:  Conseslus Kipruto  5:28.65  Gilbert Kirui  5:30.49  Zacharia Kiprotich  5:37.98
Boys' hammer throw:  Bence Pásztor  82.60m  Özkan Baltaci  78.63m  Serhiy Reheda  74.06m
Boys' 400m:  Arman Hall  46.01  Alphas Leken Kishoyan  46.58  Patryk Dobek  46.67
Boys' 110m hurdles:  Andries van der Merwe  13.41  Joshua Hawkins  13.44  Wilhem Belocian  13.51
Girls' high jump:  Ligia Grozav  1.87m  Iryna Herashchenko  1.87m  Chanice Porter  1.82m
Girls' 5000m walk:  Kate Veale  21:45.59  Yanxue Mao  22:00.15  Nadezhda Leontyeva  22:00.84
Girls' triple jump:  Sokhna Galle  13.62m  Jingyu Li  13.57m  Ana Peleteiro  12.92m
Girls' 400m:  Shaunae Miller  51.84  Christian Brennan  52.12  Olivia James  52.14
Asian Championships in Kobe, Japan:
Men's 100m:  Su Bingtian  10.21  Masashi Eriguchi  10.28  Sota Kawatsura  10.30
Men's 400m:  Yousef Ahmed Masrahi  45.79  Hideyuki Hirose  46.03  Yuzo Kanemaru  46.38
Men's 1500m:  Mohammad Al-Azemi  3:42.49  Sajjad Moradi  3:43.30  Chaminda Wijekoon  3:44.01
Men's 3000m steeplechase:  Abubaker Ali Kamal  8:30.23  Artem Kossinov  8:35.11  Tareq Mubarak Taher  8:45.47
Men's pole vault:  Daichi Sawano  5.50m  Hiroki Ogita  5.40m  Yang Yansheng  5.40m
Men's triple jump:  Yevgeniy Ektov  16.91m  Li Yanxi  16.70m  Roman Valiyev  16.62m
Men's decathlon:  Hadi Sepehrzad  7506 points,  Akihiko Nakamura  7478  Bharatinder Singh  7358
Women's 100m:  Guzel Khubbieva  11.39  Wei Yongli  11.70  Tao Yujia  11.74
Women's 400m:  Olga Tereshkova  52.37  Gulustan Ieso  52.80  Chen Jingwen  52.89
Women's 1500m:  Genzeb Shumi Regasa  4:15.91  Truong Thanh Hang  4:18.40  O. P. Jaisha  4:21.41
Women's discus throw:  Sun Taifeng  60.89m  Ma Xuejun  59.67m  Harwant Kaur  57.99m

Auto racing
Nationwide Series:
Feed the Children 300 in Sparta, Kentucky: (1)  Brad Keselowski (Dodge; Penske Racing) (2)  Kevin Harvick (Chevrolet; Kevin Harvick Incorporated) (3)  Kyle Busch (Toyota; Joe Gibbs Racing)
Drivers' championship standings (after 18 of 34 races): (1)  Elliott Sadler (Chevrolet; Kevin Harvick Incorporated) 641 points (2)  Reed Sorenson (Chevrolet; Turner Motorsports) 637 (3)  Ricky Stenhouse Jr. (Ford; Roush Fenway Racing) 614

Cricket
India in the West Indies:
3rd Test in Roseau, Dominica; day 3:  204;  308/6 (98 overs). India lead by 104 runs with 4 wickets remaining in the 1st innings.

Cycling
Grand Tours:
Tour de France, Stage 7:  Mark Cavendish  5h 38' 53"  Alessandro Petacchi  s.t.  André Greipel  s.t.
General classification (after stage 7): (1) Thor Hushovd   28h 29' 27" (2) Cadel Evans  + 1" (3) Fränk Schleck  + 4"

Equestrianism
FEI Nations Cup Show Jumping:
Nations Cup of Sweden in Skanör med Falsterbo (CSIO 5*):   (Marco Kutscher, Thomas Voß, Carsten-Otto Nagel, Ludger Beerbaum)   (Pénélope Leprevost, Simon Delestre, Kevin Staut, Michel Robert) &  (Malin Baryard-Johnsson, Angelica Augustsson, Peder Fredricson, Rolf-Göran Bengtsson)
Standings (after 4 of 8 events): (1)  29.5 points (2)  24 (3) Germany 21

Football (soccer)
2014 FIFA World Cup qualification (CONCACAF) First round, first leg:
 0–2  in San Cristóbal, Dominican Republic
 4–2 
Copa América in Argentina:
Group C in Mendoza:
 1–1 
 1–0 
Standings (after 2 matches): Chile, Peru 4 points, Uruguay 2, Mexico 0.

Golf
Women's majors:
U.S. Women's Open in Colorado Springs, Colorado:
Leaderboard after first round (all USA): (1) Stacy Lewis 68 (−3) (T2) Amy Anderson (a), Ryann O'Toole & Lizette Salas 69 (−2)
Leaderboard after second day (USA unless indicated): (1) I.K. Kim  −4 after 32 holes (T2) Anderson (a; after 18 holes), Lewis (after 34 holes) & Wendy Ward (after 33 holes) −2
Weather delays continue, with 66 players yet to begin their second round, and another 57 on the course. The second round resumes tomorrow.

Snooker
Wuxi Classic in Wuxi, China, quarter-finals:
Shaun Murphy  5–1 Peter Ebdon 
Ali Carter  5–3 Yu Delu 
Ding Junhui  5–4 Stephen Maguire 
Mark Selby  5–0 Graeme Dott

Tennis
Davis Cup World Group Quarterfinals:
 0–2 
Viktor Troicki  def. Michael Ryderstedt  6–3, 6–1, 6–7(6), 7–5
Janko Tipsarević  def. Ervin Eleskovic  6–2, 1–0 retired
 3–0 
Juan Ignacio Chela/Eduardo Schwank  def. Evgeny Korolev/Yuri Schukin  6–3, 6–2, 7–5
 0–2 
Feliciano López  def. Mardy Fish  6–4, 3–6, 6–3, 6–7(2), 8–6
David Ferrer  def. Andy Roddick  7–6(9), 7–5, 6–3
 0–2 
Richard Gasquet  def. Florian Mayer  4–6, 4–6, 7–5, 6–3, 6–3
Gaël Monfils  def. Philipp Kohlschreiber  7–6(3), 7–6(5), 6–4

Volleyball
FIVB World League Final round in Gdańsk and Sopot, Poland (teams in bold advance to final four):
Pool E:
 0–3 
 3–2 
Final standings: Argentina 7 points, Poland, Bulgaria 4, Italy 3.
Pool F:
 3–2 
 0–3 
Final standings: Russia 9 points, Brazil 5, United States, Cuba 2.
Men's European League, Leg 6 (teams in bold advance to final four):
Pool C:  3–1 
Standings: Romania 24 points (11 matches),  18 (10), Belarus 14 (11),  7 (10).
Women's European League, Leg 6 (teams in bold advance to final four):
Pool A:  3–2 
Standings:  29 points (10 matches), France 18 (11), Spain 14 (11),  2 (10).
Pool B:
 1–3 
 3–2 
Standings (after 11 matches): Czech Republic 27 points, Bulgaria 26, Hungary 8, Israel 5.
Pool C:
 3–0 
 3–2 
Standings (after 11 matches): Turkey 27 points, Romania 19, Belarus 16, Croatia 4.
Women's Pan-American Cup in Ciudad Juárez, Mexico:
Ninth place match:  1–3 
Classification 5–8:
 3–1 
 3–2 
Semifinals:
 3–1 
 3–1

July 7, 2011 (Thursday)

Athletics
World Youth Championships in Lille Métropole, France:
Boys' 100m:  Odail Todd  10.51 Kazuma Oseto  10.52  Mickaël Zézé  10.57
Boys' shot put:  Jacko Gill  24.35m  Tyler Schultz  20.35m  Braheme Days Jr.  20.14m
Boys' long jump:  Qing Lin   7.83m  Johan Taléus  7.44m  Stefano Braga  7.42m
Boys' octathlon:  Jake Stein  6491 points  Fredrick Ekholm  6127  Felipe dos Santos  5966
Girls' 100m:  Jennifer Madu  11.57  Myasia Jacobs  11.61  Christania Williams  11.63
Girls' 100m hurdles:  Trinity Wilson  13.11  Noemi Zbären  13.17  Kendell Williams  13.28
Girls' javelin throw:  Christin Hussong  59.74m  Sofi Flinck  54.62m  Monique Cilione  52.77m
Asian Championships in Kobe, Japan:
Men's 10,000 metres:  Ali Hasan Mahboob  28:35.49  Bilisuma Shugi Gelassa  28:36.30  Akinobu Murasawa  28:40.63
Men's discus throw:  Ehsan Haddadi  62.27m   Vikas Gowda  61.58m  Wu Jian  56.61
Women's 10,000 metres:  Shitaye Eshete  32:47.80  Kareema Saleh Jasim  32:50.70  Preeja Sreedharan  33:15.55
Women's long jump:  Mayookha Johny  6.56m  Lu Minjia  6.52m  Saeko Okayama  6.51m
Women's hammer throw:  Masumi Aya  67.19m   Liu Tingting  65.42m  Yuka Murofushi  62.50m
Women's javelin throw:  Liu Chunhua  58.05m  Wang Ping  55.80m  Yuka Sato  54.16m

Cricket
India in the West Indies:
3rd Test in Roseau, Dominica; day 2:  204 (76.3 overs; Ishant Sharma 5/77);  8/0 (4 overs). India trail by 196 runs with 10 wickets remaining in the 1st innings.
India's Harbhajan Singh, with his dismissal of Carlton Baugh, becomes the eleventh bowler to claim 400 Test wickets.

Cycling
Grand Tours:
Tour de France, Stage 6:  Edvald Boasson Hagen  5h 13' 37"  Matthew Goss  s.t.  Thor Hushovd   s.t.
General classification (after stage 6): (1) Hushovd  22h 50' 34" (2) Cadel Evans  + 1" (3) Fränk Schleck  + 4"

Football (soccer)
Copa América in Argentina:
Group A in Jujuy:  0–2 
Standings (after 2 matches):  4 points, Costa Rica 3,  2, Bolivia 1.
FIFA U-17 World Cup in Mexico:
Semifinals:
 3–0  in Guadalajara
 2–3  in Torreón
UEFA Europa League First qualifying round, second leg (first leg scores in parentheses):
Shakhter Karagandy  2–1 (1–1)  Koper. Shakhter Karagandy win 3–2 on aggregate.
Metalurgist Rustavi  1–1 (1–0)  Banants. Metalurgist Rustavi win 2–1 on aggregate.
Irtysh Pavlodar  2–0 (0–1)  Jagiellonia Białystok. Irtysh Pavlodar win 2–1 on aggregate.
Ulisses  0–2 (0–3)  Ferencváros. Ferencváros win 5–0 on aggregate.
Flamurtari Vlorë  1–2 (3–1)  Budućnost Podgorica. Flamurtari Vlorë win 4–3 on aggregate.
Milsami Orhei  1–3 (0–2)  Dinamo Tbilisi. Dinamo Tbilisi win 5–1 on aggregate.
Zeta  2–1 (0–3)  Spartak Trnava. Spartak Trnava win 4–2 on aggregate.
Qarabağ  3–0 (4–0)  Banga Gargždai. Qarabağ win 7–0 on aggregate.
Fola Esch  1–1 (0–4)  Elfsborg. Elfsborg win 5–1 on aggregate.
Nõmme Kalju  0–2 (0–0)  Honka. Honka win 2–0 on aggregate.
Lusitanos  0–1 (1–5)  Varaždin. Varaždin win 6–1 on aggregate.
Tromsø  2–1 (5–0)  Daugava Daugavpils. Tromsø win 7–1 on aggregate.
Häcken  5–1 (1–1)  Käerjéng 97. Häcken win 6–2 on aggregate.
Vllaznia Shkodër  1–1 (1–0)  Birkirkara. Vllaznia Shkodër win 2–1 on aggregate.
Minsk  2–1 (1–1)  AZAL Baku. Minsk win 3–2 on aggregate.
NSÍ Runavík  0–0 (0–3)  Fulham. Fulham win 3–0 on aggregate.
Paks  4–0 (1–0)  UE Santa Coloma. Paks win 5–0 on aggregate.
Neath  0–2 (1–4)  Aalesund. Aalesund win 6–1 on aggregate.
Rabotnički  3–0 (4–1)  Narva Trans. Rabotnički win 7–1 on aggregate.
Olimpija Ljubljana  3–0 (0–0)  Široki Brijeg. Olimpija Ljubljana win 3–0 on aggregate.
Tre Penne  1–3 (0–6)  Rad. Rad win 9–1 on aggregate.
St Patrick's Athletic  2–0 (0–1)  ÍBV Vestmannaeyar. St Patrick's Athletic win 2–1 on aggregate.
Cliftonville  0–1 (1–1)  The New Saints. The New Saints win 2–1 on aggregate.
Glentoran  2–1 (a.e.t.) (1–2)  Renova. 3–3 on aggregate; Glentoran win 3–2 on penalties.
KR Reykjavík  5–1 (3–1)  ÍF Fuglafjørður. KR Reykjavík win 8–2 on aggregate.

Golf
Women's majors:
U.S. Women's Open in Colorado Springs, Colorado:
Leaderboard after first day: (T1) Cristie Kerr  −2 after 15 holes & Amy Anderson  −2 after 12 (T3) Inbee Park  −1 after 17, Ai Miyazato  −1 after 15 & Silvia Cavalleri  −1 after 1
131 players will complete their first rounds on July 8.

Snooker
Wuxi Classic in Wuxi, China, round 1:
Peter Ebdon  5–3 Rouzi Maimaiti 
Matthew Stevens  4–5 Yu Delu 
Stephen Maguire  5–2 Liang Wenbo 
Graeme Dott  5–2 Cao Yupeng

Tennis
Davis Cup World Group Quarterfinals:
 2–0 
Juan Mónaco  def. Andrey Golubev  6–3, 6–0, 6–4
Juan Martín del Potro  def. Mikhail Kukushkin  6–2, 6–1, 6–2

Volleyball
FIVB World League Final round in Gdańsk and Sopot, Poland (teams in bold advance to final four):
Pool E:
 0–3 
 3–0 
Standings (after 2 matches): Argentina 6 points, Italy 3, Poland 2, Bulgaria 1.
Pool F:
 0–3 
 1–3 
Standings (after 2 matches): Russia 6 points, Brazil 5, Cuba 1, United States 0.
Women's Pan-American Cup in Ciudad Juárez, Mexico:
Eleventh place match:  0–3 
Classification 7–10:
 3–0 
 3–0 
Quarterfinals:
 3–0 
 3–0

July 6, 2011 (Wednesday)

Athletics
World Youth Championships in Lille Métropole, France:
Boys' discus throw:  Fedrick Dacres  67.05m  Ethan Cochran  61.37m  Gerhard de Beer  60.63m
Girls' 3000m:  Gotytom Gebreslase  8:56.36  Ziporah Wanjiru Kngori  8:56.82  Caroline Chepkoech Kipkirui  8:58.63
Girls' shot put:  Tiangian Guo  15.24m  Sophie McKinna  14.90m  Katinka Urbaniak  14.71m

Cricket
Sri Lanka in England:
4th ODI in Nottingham:  174 (43.4 overs);  171/0 (23.5/48 overs). England win by 10 wickets (D/L); 5-match series tied 2–2.
India in the West Indies:
3rd Test in Roseau, Dominica; day 1:  75/3 (31.1 overs);

Cycling
Grand Tours:
Tour de France, Stage 5:  Mark Cavendish  3h 38' 32"  Philippe Gilbert  s.t.  José Joaquín Rojas   s.t.
General classification (after stage 5): (1) Thor Hushovd   17h 36' 57" (2) Cadel Evans   + 1" (3) Fränk Schleck  + 4"

Football (soccer)
FIFA Women's World Cup in Germany (teams in bold advance to quarterfinals):
Group C:
 2–1  in Wolfsburg
 0–0  in Bochum
Final standings: Sweden 9 points, United States 6, North Korea, Colombia 1.
Group D:
 0–3  in Frankfurt
 2–1  in Leverkusen
Final standings: Brazil 9 points, Australia 6, Norway 3, Equatorial Guinea 0.
Copa América in Argentina:
Group A in Santa Fe:  0–0 
Standings: Colombia 4 points (2 matches), Argentina 2 (2),  1 (1),  0 (1).
UEFA Champions League First qualifying round, second leg (first leg score in parentheses):
Valletta  2–1 (3–0)  Tre Fiori. Valletta win 5–1 on aggregate.

Olympic Games
Pyeongchang, South Korea is selected as host of the 2018 Winter Olympics at the 123rd IOC Session in Durban.

Rugby league
State of Origin Series:
Game III in Brisbane: Queensland  34–24  New South Wales. Queensland win series 2–1.
Queensland win the series for the sixth successive time and 18th time overall.

Volleyball
FIVB World League Final round in Gdańsk and Sopot, Poland:
Pool E:
 3–1 
 3–2 
Pool F:
 3–1 
 3–2

July 5, 2011 (Tuesday)

Cricket
ICC Intercontinental Cup One-Day:
2nd Match in Belfast:  175 (36/38 overs);  176/2 (30.2 overs). Ireland win by 8 wickets.

Cycling
Grand Tours:
Tour de France, Stage 4:  Cadel Evans  4h 11' 39"  Alberto Contador  s.t.  Alexander Vinokourov  s.t.
General classification (after stage 4): (1) Thor Hushovd   13h 58' 25" (2) Evans  + 1" (3) Fränk Schleck  + 4"

Football (soccer)
FIFA Women's World Cup in Germany  (teams in bold advance to quarterfinals):
Group A:
 2–4  in Mönchengladbach
 0–1  in Dresden
Final standings: Germany 9 points, France 6, Nigeria 3, Canada 0.
Group B:
 2–0  in Augsburg
 2–2  in Sinsheim
Final standings: England 7 points, Japan 6, Mexico 2, New Zealand 1.
UEFA Champions League First qualifying round, second leg (first leg score in parentheses):
F91 Dudelange  2–0 (2–0)  FC Santa Coloma. F91 Dudelange win 4–0 on aggregate.

Volleyball
Women's Pan-American Cup in Ciudad Juárez, Mexico (teams in bold advance to semifinals, teams in italics advance to quarterfinals):
Group A:
 3–0 
 1–3 
 0–3 
Final standings: Dominican Republic 15 points, Cuba 12, Argentina 9, Canada 6, Mexico 3, Chile 0.
Group B:
 0–3 
 1–3 
 3–2 
Final standings: Brazil 14 points, United States 13, Puerto Rico 9, Peru 6, Trinidad and Tobago 3, Costa Rica 0.

July 4, 2011 (Monday)

Cricket
ICC Intercontinental Cup One-Day:
1st Match in Belfast:  241 (49.5 overs);  215 (48.4 overs). Ireland win by 26 runs.

Cycling
Grand Tours:
Tour de France, Stage 3:  Tyler Farrar   4h 40' 21"  Romain Feillu  s.t.  José Joaquín Rojas  s.t.
General classification (after stage 3): (1) Thor Hushovd   9h 46' 46" (2) David Millar  + 0" (3) Cadel Evans  + 1"

Football (soccer)
FIFA U-17 World Cup in Mexico:
Quarterfinals:
 3–2  in Morelia
 1–2  in Pachuca
Copa América in Argentina:
Group C in San Juan:
 1–1 
 2–1

Volleyball
Women's Pan-American Cup in Ciudad Juárez, Mexico:
Group A:
 3–0 
 3–0 
 3–0 
Standings (after 4 matches): Cuba, Dominican Republic 12 points, Argentina 6, Canada, Mexico 3, Chile 0.
Group B:
 3–0 
 3–0 
 3–0 
Standings (after 4 matches): United States, Brazil 12 points, Puerto Rico, Peru 6, Trinidad and Tobago, Costa Rica 0.

July 3, 2011 (Sunday)

Auto racing
World Touring Car Championship:
Race of Portugal in Porto:
Race 1: (1) Alain Menu  (Chevrolet; Chevrolet Cruze) (2) Yvan Muller  (Chevrolet; Chevrolet Cruze) (3) Robert Huff  (Chevrolet; Chevrolet Cruze)
Race 2: (1) Huff (2) Muller (3) Tiago Monteiro  (Sunred Engineering; SEAT León)
Drivers' championship standings (after 6 of 12 rounds): (1) Huff 227 points (2) Muller 198 (3) Menu 167
Intercontinental Le Mans Cup
6 Hours of Imola in Imola, Italy:   #7 Peugeot Sport Total (Sébastien Bourdais , Anthony Davidson )   #8 Peugeot Sport Total (Franck Montagny , Stéphane Sarrazin )   #1 Audi Sport Team Joest (Timo Bernhard , Marcel Fässler )

Basketball
EuroBasket Women in Łódź, Poland:
Bronze medal game:  56–63  
Final:   59–42  
Russia win the title for the third time and qualify for 2012 Olympic Tournament.
Turkey, France, Czech Republic and  qualify for 2012 FIBA Olympic Qualifying Tournament.

Cricket
Sri Lanka in England:
3rd ODI in London:  246/7 (50 overs; Alastair Cook 119);  249/4 (48.2 overs; Dinesh Chandimal 105*). Sri Lanka win by 6 wickets; lead 5-match series 2–1.

Cycling
Grand Tours:
Tour de France, Stage 2:   24' 48"   + 4"   + 4"
General classification (after stage 2): (1) Thor Hushovd   5h 06' 25" (2) David Millar  + 0" (3) Cadel Evans  + 1"

Field hockey
Women's Champions Trophy in Amsterdam, Netherlands:
7th place match:  3–5 
5th place match:  2–0 
3rd place match:  2–3  
Final:   3–3  (3–2 pen.)  
Netherlands win the title for the sixth time.

Football (soccer)
FIFA Women's World Cup in Germany:
Group D (team in bold advances to quarterfinals):
 3–2  in Bochum
 3–0  in Wolfsburg
Standings (after 2 matches): Brazil 6 points, Australia, Norway 3, Equatorial Guinea 0.
2014 FIFA World Cup qualification (AFC) First round, second leg (first leg scores in parentheses):
 3–2 (1–2) . 4–4 on aggregate, Malaysia win on away goals.
 0–0 (0–3) . Bangladesh win 3–0 on aggregate.
 6–2 (a.e.t.) (2–4) . Laos win 8–6 on aggregate.
 4–0 (1–1) . Philippines win 5–1 on aggregate.
 1–1 (2–0) . Palestine win 3–1 on aggregate.
 1–7 (0–6) . Vietnam win 13–1 on aggregate.
 2–0 (0–1) . Myanmar win 2–1 on aggregate.
2014 FIFA World Cup qualification (CONCACAF) First round, first leg:  2–0 
FIFA U-17 World Cup in Mexico:
Quarterfinals:
 2–0  in Monterrey
 2–3  in Querétaro
Copa América in Argentina:
Group B:
 0–0  in La Plata
 0–0  in Santa Fe

Golf
PGA Tour:
AT&T National in Newtown Square, Pennsylvania:
Winner: Nick Watney  267 (−13)
Watney wins his second PGA Tour title of the season and fourth of his career.
European Tour:
Alstom Open de France in Guyancourt, France:
Winner: Thomas Levet  277 (−7)
Levet wins his sixth European Tour title.
Champions Tour:
Montreal Championship in Blainville, Quebec, Canada:
Winner: John Cook  195 (−21)
Cook wins his third Champions Tour title of the season, and eighth of his career.

Motorcycle racing
Moto GP:
Italian Grand Prix in Mugello, Italy:
MotoGP: (1) Jorge Lorenzo  (Yamaha) (2) Andrea Dovizioso  (Honda) (3) Casey Stoner  (Honda)
Riders' championship standings (after 8 of 18 races): (1) Stoner 152 points (2) Lorenzo 133 (3) Dovizioso 119
Moto2: (1) Marc Márquez  (Suter) (2) Stefan Bradl  (Kalex) (3) Bradley Smith  (Tech 3)
Riders' championship standings (after 8 of 17 races): (1) Bradl 147 points (2) Márquez 95 (3) Smith 79
125cc: (1) Nicolás Terol  (Aprilia) (2) Johann Zarco  (Derbi) (3) Maverick Viñales  (Aprilia)
Riders' championship standings (after 8 of 17 races): (1) Terol 153 points (2) Zarco 114 (3) Viñales 106

Taekwondo
World Olympic Qualification Tournament in Baku, Azerbaijan (top 3 qualify for 2012 Olympics):
Men's +80 kg:  Cha Dong-Min   Gadzhi Umarov   Alexandros Nikolaidis 
Women's 57 kg:  Tseng Pei-hua   Hou Yuzhuo   Ana Zaninović

Tennis
Grand Slams:
Wimbledon Championships in London, England, day 13:
Men's singles - Final: Novak Djokovic  [2] def. Rafael Nadal  [1] 6–4, 6–1, 1–6, 6–3
Djokovic wins his first Wimbledon title, and the second Grand Slam title of the year and third overall.
Mixed doubles - Final: Jürgen Melzer  / Iveta Benešová  [9] def. Mahesh Bhupathi  / Elena Vesnina  [4] 6–3, 6–2
Melzer and Benešová win their first Grand Slam title in mixed doubles.
Girls' singles - Final: Ashleigh Barty  [12] def. Irina Khromacheva  [3] 7–5, 7–6(3)
Barty wins her first girls' Grand Slam title.
Boys' doubles - Final: George Morgan  / Mate Pavić  [2] def. Oliver Golding  / Jiří Veselý  [1] 3–6, 6–4, 7–5
Girls' doubles - Final: Eugenie Bouchard  / Grace Min  [2] def. Demi Schuurs  / Tang Haochen  5–7, 6–2, 7–5
Gentlemen's Invitation Doubles Final: Jacco Eltingh  / Paul Haarhuis  def. Jonas Björkman  / Todd Woodbridge  3–6, 6–3, [13–11]
Ladies' Invitation Doubles Final: Lindsay Davenport  / Martina Hingis  def. Martina Navratilova  / Jana Novotná  6–4, 6–4
Senior Gentlemen's Invitation Doubles Final: Pat Cash  / Mark Woodforde  def. Jeremy Bates  / Anders Järryd  6–3, 5–7, [10–5]
Wheelchair men's doubles final: Maikel Scheffers  / Ronald Vink  [1] def. Stéphane Houdet  / Michaël Jérémiasz  7–5, 6–2
Wheelchair women's doubles final: Esther Vergeer  / Sharon Walraven  [1] def. Jiske Griffioen  / Aniek van Koot  [2] 6–4, 3–6, 7–5

Volleyball
Women's Pan-American Cup in Ciudad Juárez, Mexico:
Group A:
 3–0 
 3–0 
 3–0 
Standings (after 3 matches): Dominican Republic, Cuba 9 points, Canada, Argentina, Mexico 3, Chile 0.
Group B:
 3–0 
 3–0 
 3–0 
Standings (after 3 matches): Brazil, United States 9 points, Peru 6, Puerto Rico 3, Trinidad and Tobago, Costa Rica 0.

July 2, 2011 (Saturday)

Auto racing
Sprint Cup Series:
Coke Zero 400 in Daytona Beach, Florida: (1)  David Ragan (Ford; Roush Fenway Racing) (2)  Matt Kenseth (Ford; Roush Fenway Racing) (3)  Joey Logano (Toyota; Joe Gibbs Racing)
Drivers' championship standings (after 17 of 36 races): (1)  Kevin Harvick (Chevrolet; Richard Childress Racing) 586 points (2)  Carl Edwards (Ford; Roush Fenway Racing) 581 (3)  Kyle Busch (Toyota; Joe Gibbs Racing) 576

Basketball
EuroBasket Women in Łódź, Poland:
7th place game:  56–75 
5th place game (winner qualifies for 2012 FIBA Olympic Qualifying Tournament):  73–59

Cricket
India in the West Indies:
2nd Test in Bridgetown, Barbados, day 5:  201 & 269/6d (102 overs; Fidel Edwards 5/76);  190 & 202/7 (71.3 overs). Match drawn; India lead 3-match series 1–0.

Cycling
Grand Tours:
Tour de France, Stage 1:  Philippe Gilbert   4h 41' 31"  Cadel Evans  + 3"  Thor Hushovd  + 6"

Equestrianism
Show jumping – Global Champions Tour:
6th Competition in Cascais (CSI 5*):  Christian Ahlmann  on Taloubet Z  Luciana Diniz  on Winningmood  Ludger Beerbaum  on Chaman
Standings (after 6 of 10 competitions): (1) Beerbaum 186.5 points (2) Edwina Alexander  155 (3) Diniz 149

Field hockey
Women's Champions Trophy in Amsterdam, Netherlands (teams in bold advance to the final):
Pool C:
 3–2 
 0–2 
Final standings: Netherlands 7 points, Argentina, Korea 4, New Zealand 1.

Football (soccer)
FIFA Women's World Cup in Germany:
Group C (teams in bold advance to quarterfinals):
 0–1  in Leverkusen
 3–0  in Sinsheim
Standings (after 2 matches): United States, Sweden 6 points, North Korea, Colombia 0.
2014 FIFA World Cup qualification (AFC) First round, second leg (first leg scores in parentheses):
 0–5 (1–2)  in Kathmandu. Nepal win 7–1 on aggregate.
2014 FIFA World Cup qualification (CONCACAF) First round, first leg:  0–4 
Copa América in Argentina:
Group A in Jujuy:  1–0 
 Canadian Championship Final, second leg (first leg score in parentheses):
Toronto FC 2–1 (1–1) Vancouver Whitecaps. Toronto win 3–2 on aggregate.
Toronto win the title for the third successive time.

Handball
Pan American Women's Championship in São Bernardo do Campo, Brazil:
Bronze medal game:   37–27 
Gold medal match:   16–35  
Brazil win the title for the seventh time. Argentina, Cuba and Uruguay qualify for the World Championship, along with hosts Brazil.

Mixed martial arts
UFC 132 in Las Vegas, United States:
Bantamweight Championship bout: Dominick Cruz  (c) def. Urijah Faber  via unanimous decision (50–45, 49–46, 48–47)
Middleweight bout: Chris Leben  def. Wanderlei Silva  via KO (punches)
Light Heavyweight bout: Tito Ortiz  def. Ryan Bader  via submission (guillotine choke)
Welterweight bout: Carlos Condit  def. Kim Dong-hyun  via TKO (flying knee and punches)
Lightweight bout: Dennis Siver  def. Matt Wiman  via unanimous decision (29–28, 29–28, 29–28)

Rugby union
Super Rugby finals:
Semi-finals:
In Brisbane: Reds  30–13  Blues
In Cape Town: Stormers  10–29  Crusaders
IRB Pacific Nations Cup, round 1:
 45–21  in Lautoka, Fiji
 34–15  in Tokyo, Japan

Taekwondo
World Olympic Qualification Tournament in Baku, Azerbaijan (top 3 qualify for 2012 Olympics):
Men's 80 kg:  Ramin Azizov   Yousef Karami   Mauro Sarmiento 
Women's 49 kg:  Wu Jingyu   Lucija Zaninović   Yang Shu-chun

Tennis
Grand Slams:
Wimbledon Championships in London, England, day 12:
Women's singles - Final: Petra Kvitová  [8] def. Maria Sharapova  [5] 6–3, 6–4
Kvitová wins her first Grand Slam title, and becomes the first Czech woman since Jana Novotná at the 1998 Wimbledon Championships to win a Grand Slam singles title.
Men's doubles - Final: Bob Bryan  / Mike Bryan  [1] def. Robert Lindstedt  / Horia Tecău  [8] 6–3, 6–4, 7–6(2)
The Bryans win their second Wimbledon title and a record-equalling11th Grand Slam title in men's doubles, tying the all-time record of Todd Woodbridge and Mark Woodforde.
Women's doubles - Final: Květa Peschke  / Katarina Srebotnik  [2] def. Sabine Lisicki  / Samantha Stosur  6–3, 6–1
Peschke and Srebotnik win their first women's doubles Grand Slam title.
Boys' singles - Final: Luke Saville  [16] def. Liam Broady  [15] 2–6, 6–4, 6–2
Saville wins his first boys' Grand Slam title.

Volleyball
FIVB World League, Week 6 (teams in bold advance to final round):
Pool A:  3–0 
Final standings:  30 points, United States 23,  18, Puerto Rico 1.
Women's Pan-American Cup in Ciudad Juárez, Mexico:
Group A:
 3–0 
 1–3 
 3–0 
Standings (after 2 matches): Dominican Republic, Cuba 6 points, Mexico, Argentina 3, Canada, Chile 0.
Group B:
 3–0 
 3–0 
 3–0 
Standings (after 2 matches): Brazil, United States 6 points, Puerto Rico, Peru 3, Trinidad and Tobago, Costa Rica 0.

July 1, 2011 (Friday)

Auto racing
Nationwide Series:
Subway Jalapeño 250 in Daytona Beach, Florida: (1)  Joey Logano (Toyota; Joe Gibbs Racing) (2)  Jason Leffler (Chevrolet; Turner Motorsports) (3)  Reed Sorenson (Chevrolet; Turner Motorsports)
Drivers' championship standings (after 17 of 34 races): (1) Sorenson 610 points (2)  Elliott Sadler (Chevrolet; Kevin Harvick Incorporated) 603 (3)  Ricky Stenhouse Jr. (Ford; Roush Fenway Racing) 579

Basketball
EuroBasket Women in Łódź, Poland:
Classification round:  68–59 
Semifinals:
 85–53 
 68–62 (OT)

Cricket
Sri Lanka in England:
2nd ODI in Leeds:  309/5 (50 overs; Mahela Jayawardene 144);  240 (45.5 overs). Sri Lanka win by 69 runs; 5-match series tied 1–1.
India in the West Indies:
2nd Test in Bridgetown, Barbados, day 4:  201 & 229/3 (89 overs);  190. India lead by 240 runs with 7 wickets remaining.

Field hockey
Women's Champions Trophy in Amsterdam, Netherlands:
Pool D:
 1–4 
 3–2 
Final standings: England 7 points, Australia 4, Germany 3, China 2.

Football (soccer)
FIFA Women's World Cup in Germany:
Group B (team in bold advances to quarterfinals):
 4–0  in Leverkusen
 1–2  in Dresden
Standings (after 2 matches): Japan 6 points, England 4, Mexico 1, New Zealand 0.
Copa América in Argentina:
Group A in La Plata:  1–1

Taekwondo
World Olympic Qualification Tournament in Baku, Azerbaijan (top 3 qualify for 2012 Olympics):
Men's 68 kg:  Servet Tazegül   Mohammad Bagheri Motamed   Diogo Silva 
Women's +67 kg:  Gwladys Épangue   An Sae-Bom   Anastasia Baryshnikova

Tennis
Grand Slams:
Wimbledon Championships in London, England, day 11:
Men's Singles Semi-Finals:
Rafael Nadal  [1] def. Andy Murray  [4] 5–7, 6–2, 6–2, 6–4
Nadal reaches his fifth Wimbledon final in six years, and 13th Grand Slam final overall.
Novak Djokovic  [2] def. Jo-Wilfried Tsonga  [12] 7–6(4), 6–2, 6–7(9), 6–3
Djokovic reaches his first Wimbledon final, and fifth Grand Slam final overall. In doing so, Djokovic becomes the world number 1 player in the ATP rankings.

Volleyball
FIVB World League, Week 6 (teams in bold advance to final round):
Pool A:  3–2 
Standings:  30 points (12 matches), United States 20 (11),  18 (12), Puerto Rico 1 (11).
Pool B:
 2–3 
 3–0 
Final standings: Russia 31 points, Bulgaria 22, Germany 15, Japan 4.
Pool C:  3–0 
Final standings:  25 points,  21, Finland 17, Portugal 9.
Pool D:
 0–3 
 3–0 
Final standings: Italy 28 points, Cuba 23, France 11, Korea 10.
Women's Pan-American Cup in Ciudad Juárez, Mexico:
Group A:
 3–1 
 3–0 
 0–3 
Group B:
 3–0 
 3–0 
 3–0

References

7